= Military history of Japan =

- Founded: Jōmon – 1000 BC
- Current form: Japan Self-Defense Forces
- Service branches: Japan Ground Self-Defense Force; Japan Maritime Self-Defense Force; Japan Air Self-Defense Force
- Headquarters: Ministry of Defense, Tokyo, Japan

Related articles
- History: List: East Expedition of Emperor Jimmu Civil war of Wa Expeditions of Empress Jingū Goguryeo–Wa conflicts Mishihase War Baekje–Tang War Jinshin War Thirty-Eight Years' War Former Nine Years' War Gosannen War Genpei War Jōkyū War Mongol invasions of Japan Genkō War Ōei Invasion Ōnin War Seven Year War Invasion of Ryukyu Shimabara Rebellion Bombardment of Kagoshima Shimonoseki Campaign Summer War Boshin War Satsuma Rebellion First Sino-Japanese War Japanese invasion of Taiwan Boxer Rebellion Russo-Japanese War World War I Siberian Intervention Japanese invasion of Manchuria Second Sino-Japanese War Invasion of French Indochina Pacific War World War II Operation Masterdom Battle of Amami-Ōshima Iraq War Operation Ocean Shield List of wars involving Japan

The recorded military history of Japan began in 2nd century during the Yayoi period.

The Yamato tribal alliance fought amongst the Three Kingdoms of Korea, in the 5th century against Goguryeo and Silla and in 663 against Silla and Tang dynasty forces.

The Nara and Heian periods saw clan warfare and the subjugation of the Emishi people. The Kamakura shōgunate began the Japanese feudal system, led by the shōgun ruler, daimyō lords, and samurai warriors. The 15th to 16th century Sengoku period saw intense civil wars.

The 1603–1868 Tokugawa shōgunate oversaw a relative peace. Its Satsuma Domain invaded and vassalized Ryukyu in 1609. The sakoku policy limited Japan from foreign influences, from 1641 until the 1853 United States Perry Expedition. The 1868–1869 Boshin War led to the Meiji Restoration and colonization of Hokkaido.

The Japanese colonial empire, inspired by Western imperialism, fought the First Sino-Japanese War resulting in the annexation of Taiwan in 1895. The 1904–1905 Russo-Japanese War establish Japan's sphere of influence over Manchuria and Korea, and Korea was annexed in 1910.

Japan invaded Manchuria in 1931, began the full-scale Second Sino-Japanese War in 1937, and invaded French Indochina in 1940. In 1941, Japan began the Pacific War, a major theater of World War II, against the Western Allies, occupying vast areas of southeast Asia including Malaya, the Dutch East Indies, and the Philippines. Japanese war crimes contributed to an Allied civilian death toll of over 26 million. Air raids on Japan killed over a million civilians in Japan. The US atomic bombings of Hiroshima and Nagasaki remain the only uses of nuclear weapons in warfare. Alongside the Soviet invasion of Manchuria, Japan surrendered in August 1945.

The US then occupied Japan until 1952, the only foreign occupation of Japan's history. Article 9 of the 1947 Constitution renounces war and the use of force in international disputes. The 1951 U.S.–Japan Alliance requires the US to defend Japan including extending its nuclear umbrella. In 2015, the Japanese government voted to reinterpret the constitution to allow collective self-defense of Japan's allies.

The Japan Self-Defense Forces, established in 1954, consist of the Japan Ground Self-Defense Force, Japan Maritime Self-Defense Force and Japan Air Self-Defense Force. The Prime Minister serves as commander-in-chief.

== Prehistoric and Ancient Japan ==
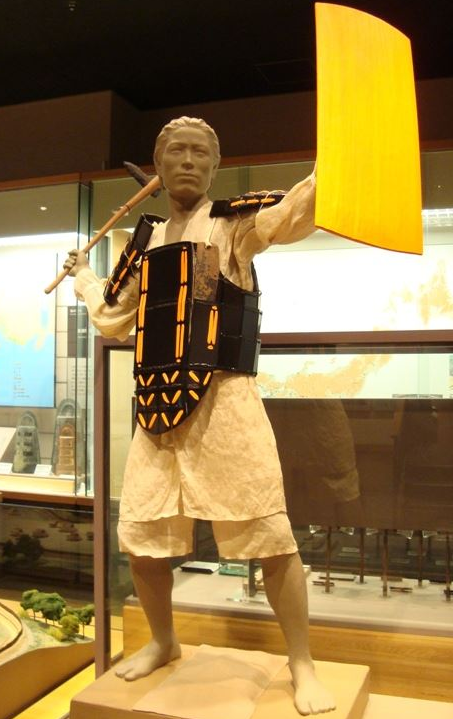
Yayoi wooden armor replica. National Museum of Japanese History.

=== Jōmon period (14,000–1000 BC) ===
The Jōmon period is the time in Japanese prehistory between c. 14,000 and 1000 BC during which the Japanese archipelago was inhabited by the Jōmon, a hunter-gatherer culture that reached a considerable degree of sedentism and cultural complexity. The name "cord-marked" was first applied by the American scholar Edward S. Morse, who discovered sherds of pottery in 1877 and subsequently translated it into Japanese as jōmon. The pottery style characteristic of the first phases of Jōmon culture was decorated by impressing cords into the surface of wet clay and is generally accepted to be among the oldest in East Asia and the world.

Near the end of the Jōon period (c. 1000 BC), villages and towns became surrounded by moats and wooden fences due to increasing violence within or between communities. Battles were fought with weapons like the sword, sling, spear, bow and arrow. Some human remains were found with arrow wounds.

=== Yayoi period (1000 BC – 300 AD) ===
The Yayoi period is the Iron Age era of Japan from 1000 BC to 300 AD. Japan transitioned to a settled agricultural society. There was a big influx of farmers from the Asian continent to Japan. The Yayoi culture flourished from southern Kyūshū to northern Honshū. The rapid increase of roughly four million people in Japan between the Jōmon and Yayoi periods are partially due to migration and due to a shift from a hunter-gatherer to an agricultural diet with the introduction of rice cultivation.

Bronze goods and bronze-making techniques from the Asian mainland reached the Japanese archipelago as early as the 3rd century BC. It is believed that bronze and, later, iron implements and weapons were introduced to Japan near the end of this time (and well into the early Yamato period). Archaeological findings suggest that bronze and iron weapons were not used for war until later, starting at the beginning of the Yamato period, as the metal weapons found with human remains do not show wear consistent with use as weapons. The transition from the Jōmon to Yayoi, and later to the Yamato period, is likely to have been characterized by violent struggle as the natives were displaced and assimilated by the invaders with their vastly superior military technology. The most well-regarded theory is that present-day Yamato Japanese are descendants of both the Indigenous Jōmon people and the immigrant Yayoi people.

Around this time, San Guo Zhi first referred to the nation of "Wa". According to this work, Wa was "divided into more than 100 tribes", and for some 70 or 80 years there were many disturbances and wars. About 30 communities had been united by a sorceress-queen named Himiko. She sent an emissary named Nashime (難升米, Nashonmi in Chinese) with a tribute of slaves and cloth to Daifang in China, establishing diplomatic relations with Cao Wei (the Chinese kingdom of Wei).

== Classical Japan ==
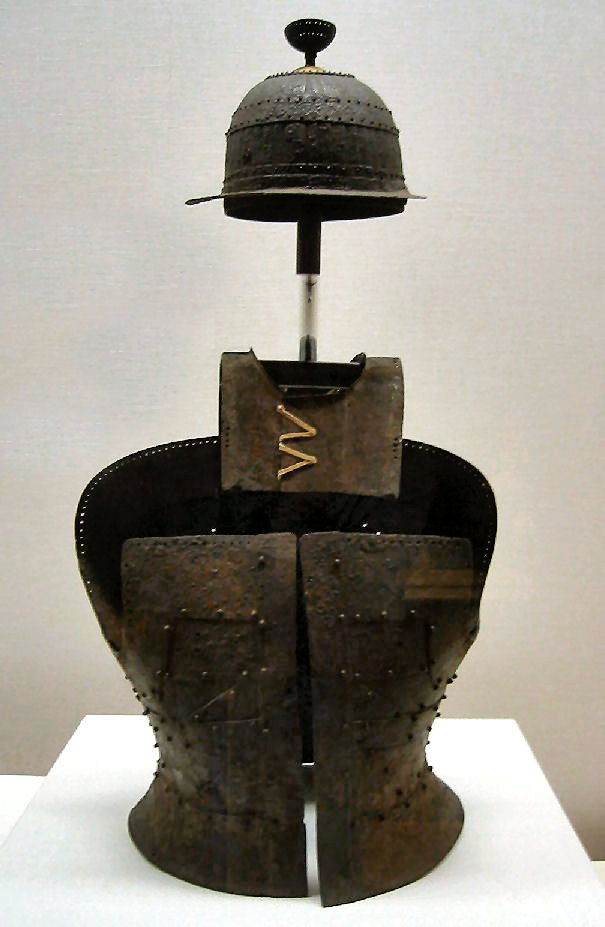
Iron helmet and armour with gilt bronze decoration, Kofun era, 5th century. Tokyo National Museum.

By the end of the 4th century, the Yamato clan was well established on the Nara plain with considerable control over the surrounding areas. The Five kings of Wa sent envoys to China to recognize their dominion of the Japanese Islands. The Nihon Shoki states that the Yamato were strong enough to have sent an army against the powerful northern Korean state of Goguryeo (of the Three Kingdoms of Korea). Yamato Japan had close relations with the southwestern Korean kingdom of Baekje. In 663, Japan, supporting Baekje, was defeated by the allied forces of Tang China and the southeastern Korean kingdom of Silla, at the Battle of Hakusonko in the Korean peninsula. As a result, the Japanese were banished from the peninsula. To defend the Japanese archipelago, a military base was constructed in Dazaifu, Fukuoka, on Kyushu.

=== Yamato period (250–710 AD) ===
This period is divided into the Kofun and Asuka period. Ancient Japan had close ties with the Gaya confederacy and Baekje on the Korean Peninsula. Gaya, where there was an abundance of naturally occurring iron, exported abundant quantities of iron armor and weapons to Wa, and there may have even been a Japanese military post there with Gaya and Baekje cooperation..

In 552, the ruler of Baekje appealed to Yamato for help against its enemies, the neighboring Silla. Along with his emissaries to the Yamato court, the Baekje king sent bronze images of Buddha, some Buddhist scriptures, and a letter praising Buddhism. These gifts triggered a powerful burst of interest in Buddhism.

In 663, near the end of the Korean Three Kingdoms period, the Battle of Baekgang (白村江) took place. The Nihon Shoki records that Yamato sent 32,000 troops and 1,000 ships to support Baekje against the Silla–Tang force. However, these ships were intercepted and defeated by a Silla–Tang fleet. Baekje, without aid and surrounded by Silla and Tang forces on land, collapsed. Silla, now viewing Wa Japan as a hostile rival, prevented Japan from having any further meaningful contact with the Korean Peninsula until a far later time. The Japanese then turned directly to China.

=== Nara period (710–794 AD) ===
In many ways, the Nara period was the beginning of Japanese culture as we know it today. It was in this period that Buddhism, the Chinese writing system, and a codified system of laws made their appearance. The country was unified and centralized, with basic features of the later feudal system. Succession disputes were widespread during this period, just as in most of the later periods.

Much of the discipline, weapons, and armor of the samurai came to be during this period, as techniques of mounted archery, swordsmanship, and spear fighting were adopted and developed.

The Nara period saw the appointment of the first Sei-i Tai-shōgun, Ōtomo no Otomaro by the Emperor in 794 CE. The shōgun was the military dictator of Japan with near absolute power over territories via the military. Ōtomo was declared "Sei-i Taishōgun" which means "Barbarian-subduing Great General". Emperor Kanmu granted the second title of Sei-i Tai-shōgun to Sakanoue no Tamuramaro for subduing the Emishi in northern Honshu.

=== Heian period (794–1185 AD) ===
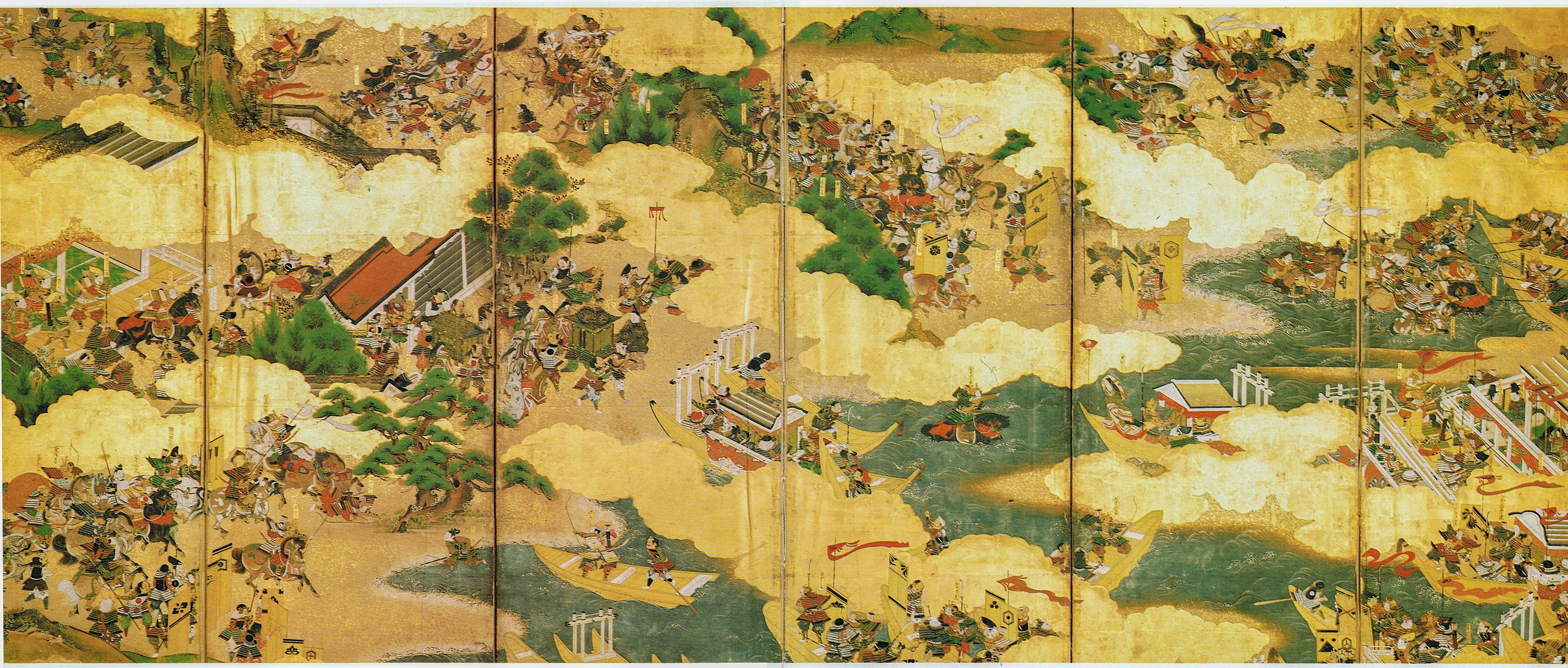
The Genpei War in the 12th century

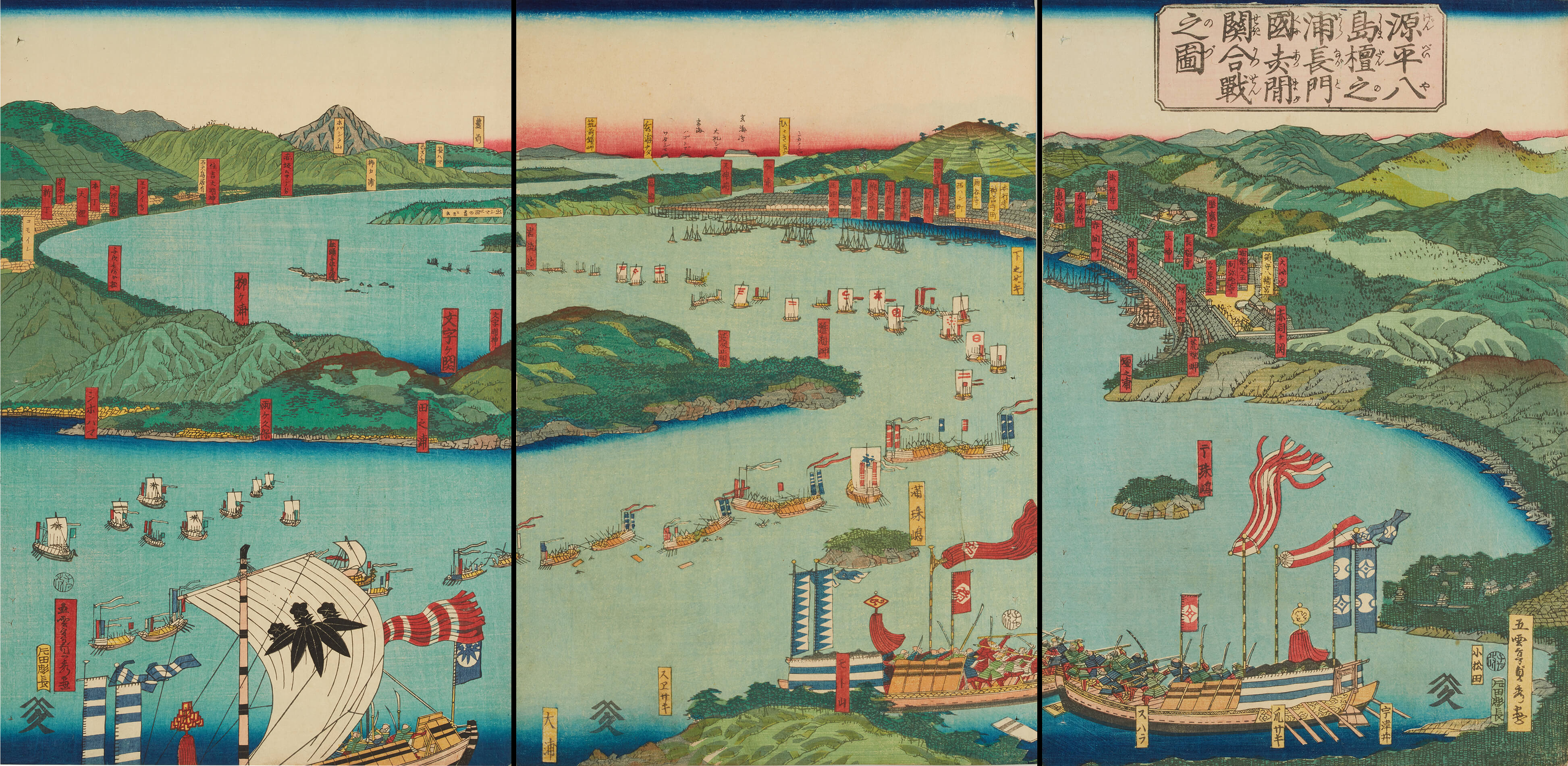
Naval battle of Dan-no-Ura in 1185

The Heian period marks a crucial shift, away from a state that was united in relative peace against outside threats to one that did not fear invasion and, instead, focused on internal division and clashes between ruling factions of samurai clans, over political power and control of the line of succession to the Chrysanthemum Throne.

With the exception of the Mongol invasions of the 13th century, Japan did not face a considerable outside threat until the arrival of Europeans in the 16th century. Thus, pre-modern Japanese military history is largely defined not by wars with other states, but by internal conflicts. The tactics of the samurai of this period involved archery and swordsmanship. Nearly all duels and battles began with an exchange of arrow fire and then hand-to-hand combat with swords and daggers.

The Imperial family struggled against the control of the Fujiwara clan, which almost exclusively monopolized the post of regent (Sesshō and Kampaku). Feudal conflicts over land, political power, and influence eventually reached its apex in the Genpei War (1180–1185). This was a national civil war between the two most powerful clans: the Taira and Minamoto clans. They fought for control over the declining Imperial Court in Kyoto. Each side had a large number of smaller allied clans. The Battle of Dan-no-Ura was a major naval battle between these clans on April 25, 1185. Minamoto had a fleet of 300 ships and Taira had 400 to 500 ships. It resulted in a decisive victory for the Minamoto clan and the destruction of the Taira clan. The end of the Genpei War brought the end of the Heian period and the beginning of the Kamakura period.

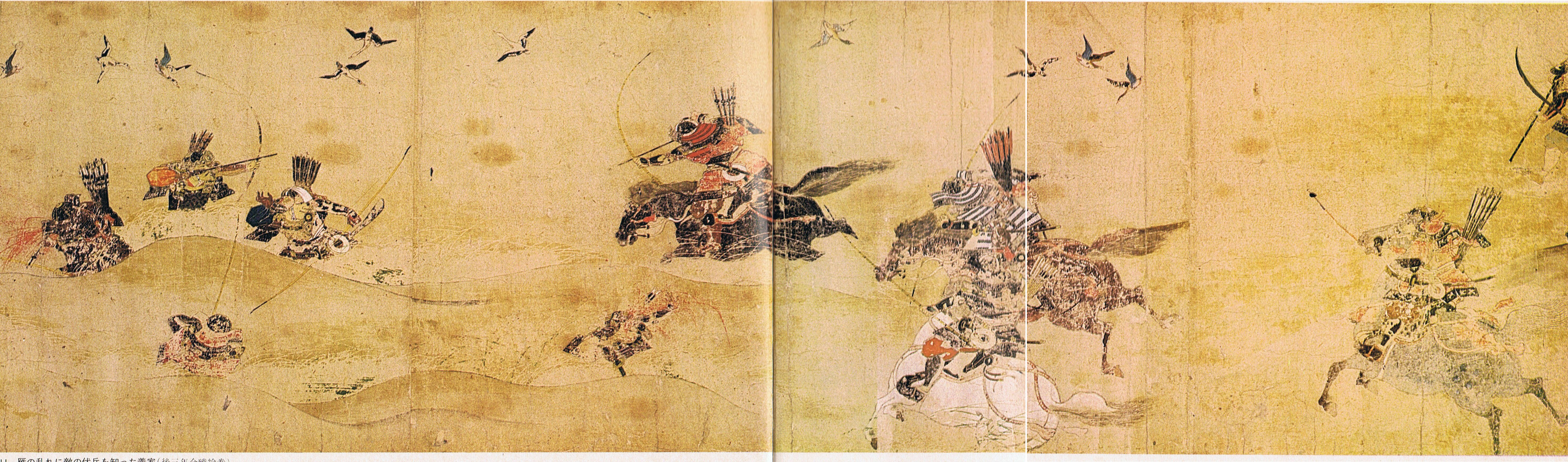
The Gosannen War in the 11th century

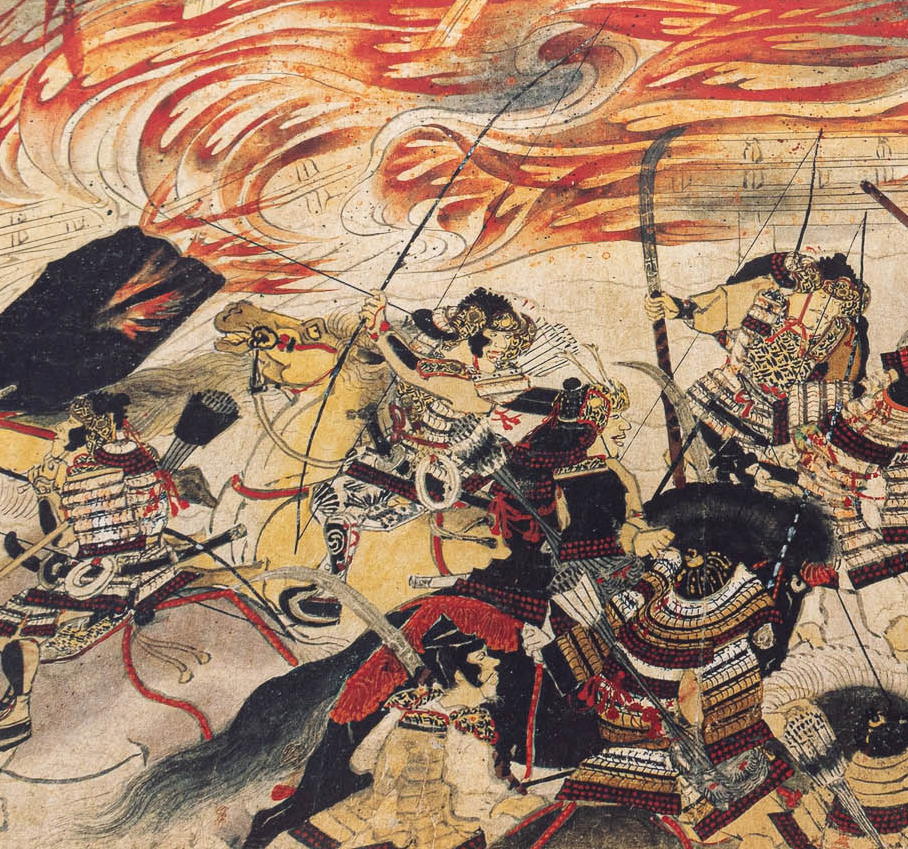
Heiji rebellion in 1159

== Feudal Japan ==
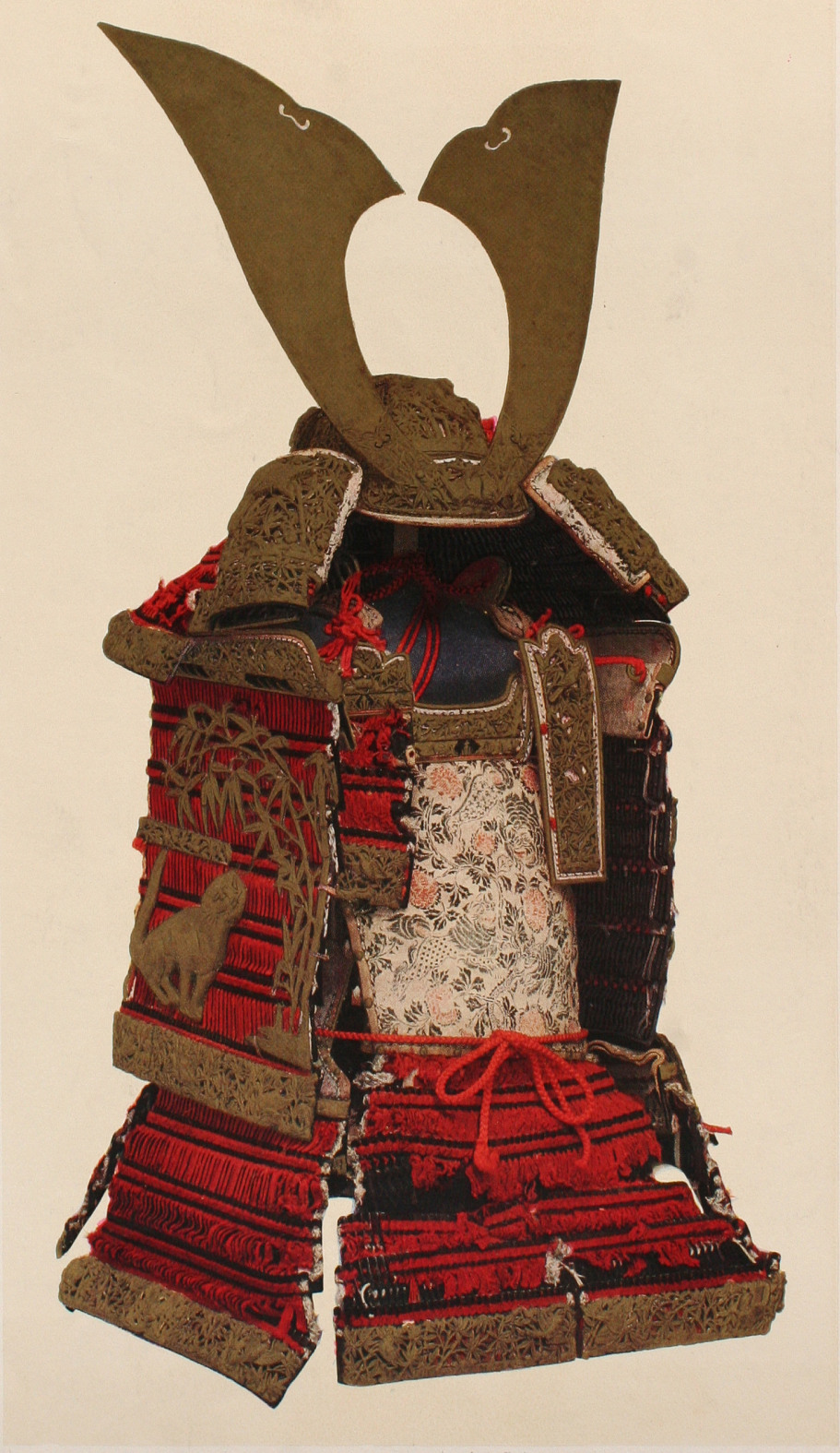
Samurai armor (Ō-yoroi)

This period is marked by the departure from relatively small or medium-sized clan-like battles, to massive clashes of clans over the control of Japan. The establishment of the Kamakura shōgunate coincided with the ascendancy of the samurai class over the aristocratic nobility kuge (公家) of the Imperial Court. The Shōgunates were military governments and de facto rulers of Japan. They dominated Japanese politics for nearly seven hundred years (1185–1868), subverting the power of the Emperor as a figurehead and the Imperial Court in Kyoto.

In the Kamakura period, Japan successfully repulsed the Mongol invasions, and this saw a large growth in the size of military forces, with samurai as an elite force and as commanders. Following roughly fifty years of bitter fighting over control of the Imperial succession, the Muromachi period, under the Ashikaga shōgunate, saw a brief period of peace as the power of the traditional systems of administration by the Imperial Court gradually declined. Later, the position of the provincial governors and other officials under the shōgunate slowly gave way into a new class of daimyōs (feudal lords) in the early 11th century. The Daimyō were protected by samurai and they dominated Japan's internal politics. This brought the Japanese archipelago into a period of 150 years of fractious disunity and war.

=== Kamakura period (1185–1333) ===
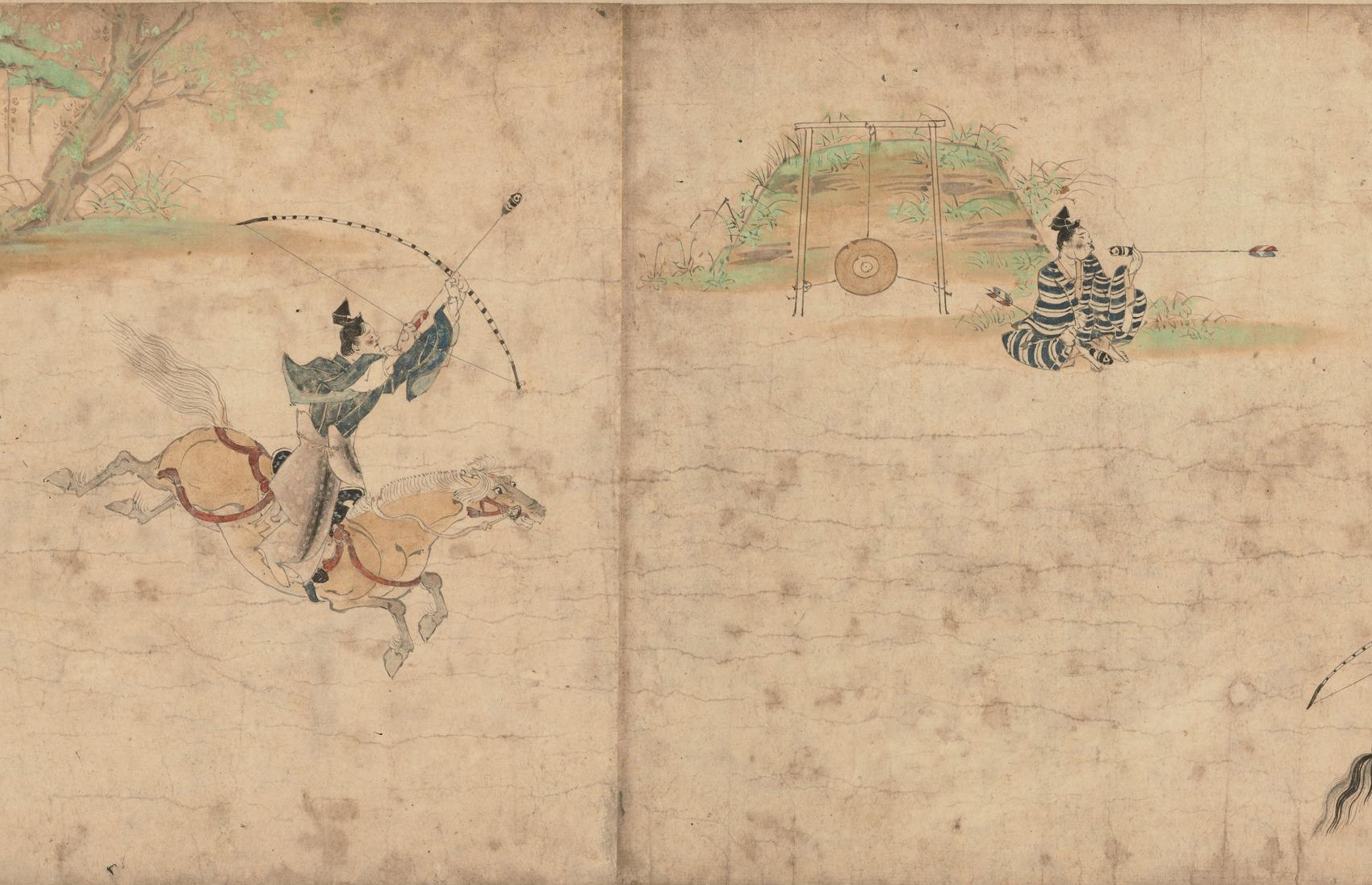
Kasagake

Before the establishment of the Kamakura shōgunate, civil power in Japan was primarily held by the ruling emperors and their regents. The regents were typically appointed from the ranks of the imperial court and the aristocratic clans that vied there. Military affairs were handled under the auspices of the civil government. After defeating their main rival the Taira clan, and the Northern Fujiwara, the Minamoto clan established the Kamakura shōgunate. Minamoto no Yoritomo seized power from the central government and the aristocracy and established a feudal system based in Kamakura. The samurai gained political power over the aristocratic nobility (kuge) of the Imperial Court in Kyoto. Emperor Go-Toba and the aristocracy remained the de jure rulers. In 1192, Yoritomo was awarded the title of Sei-i Taishōgun by Emperor Go-Toba. The political system that Yoritomo developed with a succession of shōguns as the heads of the shōgunate became known. This brought a period of peace. The battles fought during this period mainly consisted of agents of the Minamoto suppressing rebellions. Yoritomo's wife's family, the Hōjō, seized power from the Kamakura shōgun. When Yoritomo's sons and heirs were assassinated, the shōgun himself became a hereditary figurehead. Real power rested with the Hōjō regents. The Kamakura shōgunate lasted for almost 150 years, from 1192 to 1333. The Mongol invasions of Japan (1274 and 1281) were the most important wars of the Kamakura period and defining events in Japanese history.

Japan's remote location makes it secure against invaders from the Asian continent. The Japanese archipelago is surrounded by vast seas and has rugged, mountainous terrain with steep rivers. Kyushu is closest to the southernmost point of the Korean peninsula with a distance of 190 km (120 mi). That's almost 6 times farther away than from England to France 33.3 km (20.7 mi). Throughout history, Japan was never fully invaded nor colonized by foreigners. Japan only surrendered once after World War II.

Gorō Nyūdō Masamune (五郎入道正宗; Priest Gorō Masamune, c.1264–1343), is recognized as Japan's greatest swordsmith. He created the finest swords and daggers (called tachi and tantō), in the Soshu tradition.

==== First Mongol Invasion (1274) ====
The First Mongol invasion of Japan. The samurai Takezaki Suenaga fights back Mongol warriors in 1274.

In the 13th century, the Mongols conquered and controlled China under the Yuan dynasty. Subsequently, they attempted to invade Japan twice. In early October 1274, the Battle of Bun'ei began with a combined force of Mongols and Koreans. They arrived on ships and seized the Japanese islands Tsushima, Iki island, Hirato island, Taka and Nokono. The Mongols slaughtered the inhabitants of Tsushima and about 1000 Japanese soldiers were killed on Iki island. When the Mongols arrived on Japan's mainland of Kyushu they encountered the first real Japanese army. During the Battle of Akasaka the Japanese won with a surprise attack by the forces of Kikuchi Takefusa. The second victory was at the Battle of Torikai-Gata where the samurai of Takezaki Suenaga and Shiraishi Michiyasu killed 3,500 Mongols. The Mongol army and Hong Dagu withdrew to their ships towards the Yuan Dynasty. The Japanese army conducted night attacks and killed as many soldiers as they could. On the night of October 19, a typhoon caused one-third of their returning ships to sink and many Mongol soldiers drowned. This typhoon was called the Kamikaze which means "divinely conjured wind".

==== Second Mongol Invasion (1281) ====
The Kamakura shōgunate anticipated a second invasion so they constructed walls and fortresses along the shore and gathered forces to defend it. In the spring of 1281, Kublai Khan sent two separate forces. An impressive 900 ships containing 40,000 Yuan troops set out from Masan, Korea, while an even larger force of 100,000 sailed from southern China in 3,500 ships. The Mongols planned an overwhelming coordinated attack by the combined imperial Yuan fleets. The Chinese fleet of the Yuan was delayed by difficulties in provisioning and manning their large number of ships.

This culminated in the Battle of Kōan. The Eastern Route Army arrived at Hakata Bay in Kyushu on June 21, 1281. They proceeded without the larger southern force. Waves of samurai responded and prevented the Mongols from forming a beachhead. The samurai used a harassment tactic by boarding the Yuan ships with small boats at night. They killed many of the Yuan forces in the bay and the samurai left before dawn. This caused the Yuan to retreat to Tsushima. During the next few weeks up to 3000 Yuan were killed in close quarters. On July 16, the first of the Southern force ships arrived. By August 12, the two fleets were ready to attack Japan. However, on August 15 a major typhoon (kamikaze) struck the Tsushima Strait. It lasted two full days and destroyed most of the Yuan fleet. Over 4,000 ships were destroyed in the storm; 80 percent of the Yuan soldiers drowned or were killed by samurai on the beaches. The loss of ships was so great that "a person could walk across from one point of land to another on a mass of wreckage".

The equipment, tactics, and military attitudes of the samurai and their Mongol opponents differed greatly, and while both invasions failed miserably, their impact on developments and changes in samurai battle were quite significant. The samurai remained attached to ideas of single combat, that of honorable battle between individual warriors, and to certain ritual elements of battle, such as a series of archery exchanges conducted before entering into hand-to-hand fighting. The Mongols, of course, knew nothing of Japanese conventions, and were arguably much more organized in their strike tactics. They did not select individual opponents with whom to conduct honorable duels, but rode forth on horseback, with various forms of gunpowder weapons and the famous Mongol bow, charging into enemy lines and killing as many as they could without regard to Japanese conceptions of protocol. Though archery and mounted combat were central to Japanese warfare at this time as well, the Mongols remain famous even today for their prowess in these matters. The ways that samurai tactics and attitudes were affected by these experiences are difficult to ascertain, but they were certainly significant.

==== Kusunoki Masashige ====
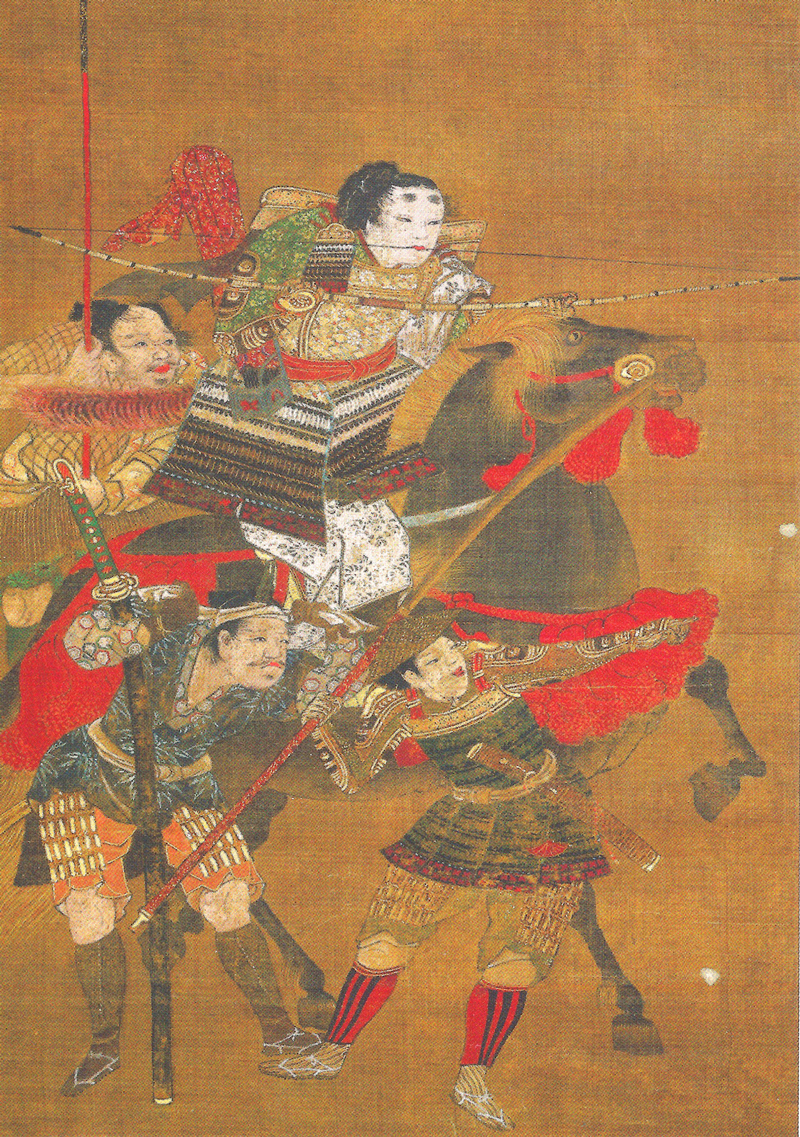
Prince Moriyoshi

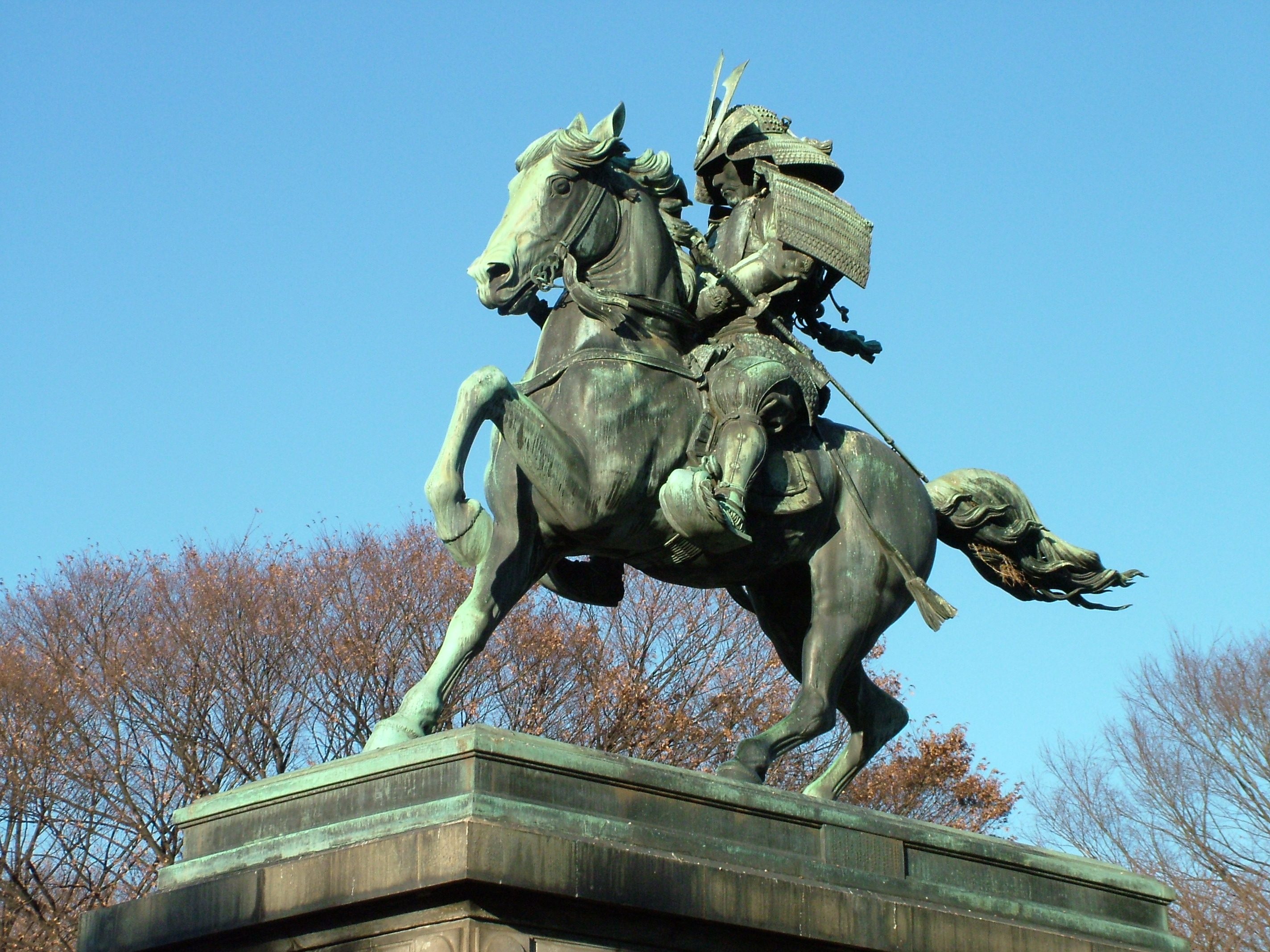
Kusunoki Masashige

One of the greatest samurai was Kusunoki Masashige. He lived during the Kamakura period and represents the ideal of samurai loyalty. Kusunoki fought against the Kamakura shōgunate in the Genkō War (1331–1333) to restore power to Emperor Go-Daigo. Kusunoki was also a brilliant tactician and strategist. The defense of two key Loyalist fortresses at Akasaka, the Siege of Akasaka, and Chihaya, the Siege of Chihaya, helped enable Emperor Go-Daigo to briefly regain power. In 1333, Go-Daigo rewarded Kusunoki with governorship of Settsu Province and Kawachi Province. The Meiji government posthumously gave Kusunoki the highest decoration of Senior First Rank in 1880. Kusunoki "stands in the history of his country as the ideal figure of a warrior, compact of civil and military virtues in a high degree".

=== Muromachi period (1336–1467) ===
The shōgunate fell in the wake of the 1331 Genkō War, an uprising against the shōgunate organized by the Emperor Go-Daigo. After a brief period under true Imperial rule, the Ashikaga shōgunate was established in 1336, and a series of conflicts known as the Nanboku-chō wars began. For over fifty years, the archipelago became embroiled in disputes over control of Imperial succession, and thus over the country.

Battles grew larger in this period, and were less ritualized. Though single combats and other elements of ritual and honorable battle remained, organized strategies and tactics under military commanders began to emerge, along with a greater degree of organization of formations and divisions within armies. It was in this period, as well, that weapon-smithing techniques emerged, creating so-called "Japanese steel" blades, prone to breaking yet extremely precise and sharp. The katana, and myriad similar or related blade weapons, appeared at this time and would dominate Japanese arms, relatively unchanged, through the mid-20th century. As a result, it was also during this period that the shift of samurai from being archers to swordsmen began in a significant way.

=== Sengoku period (1467–1603) ===
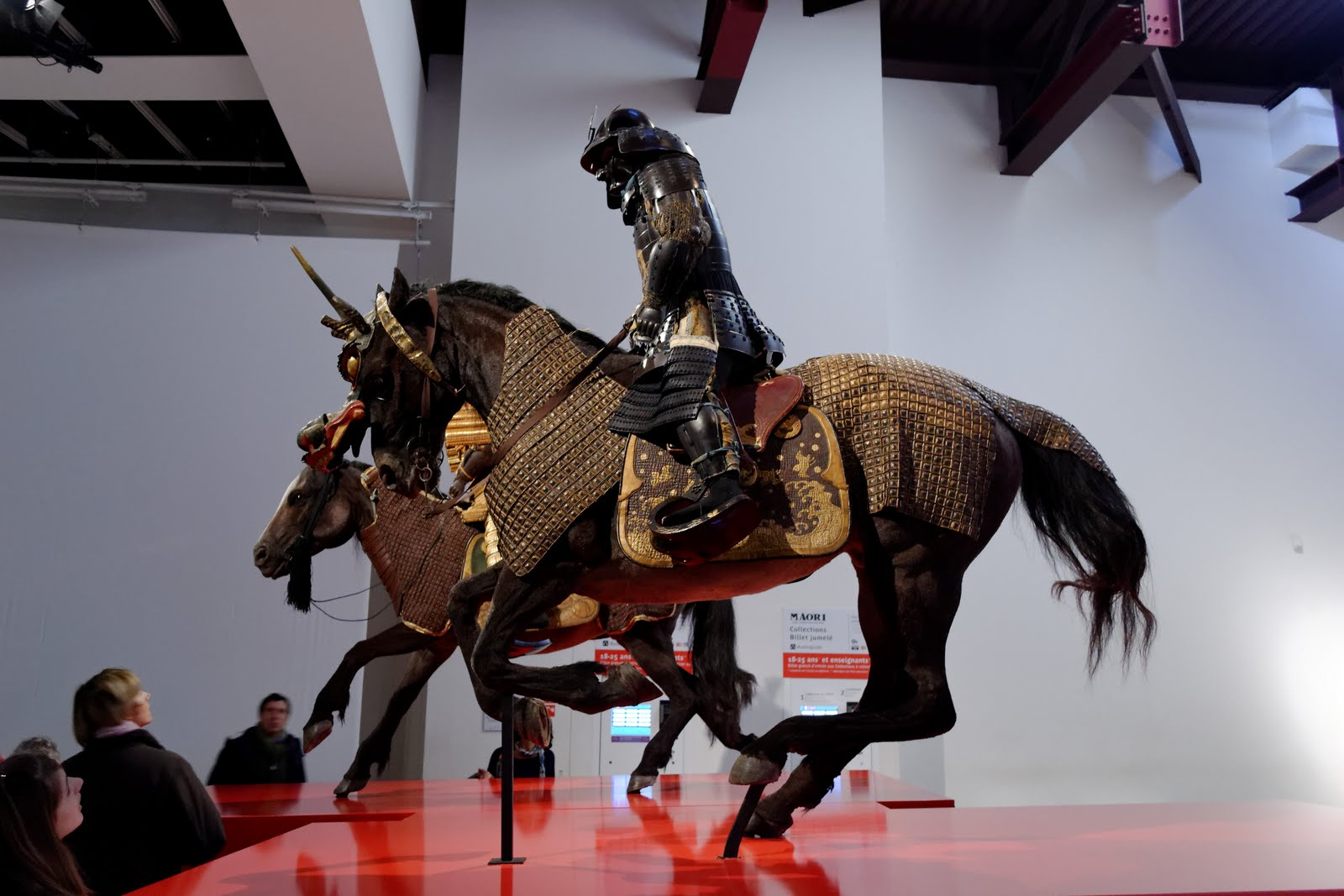
A re-creation of an armored samurai riding a horse, showing horse armour (uma yoroi or bagai)

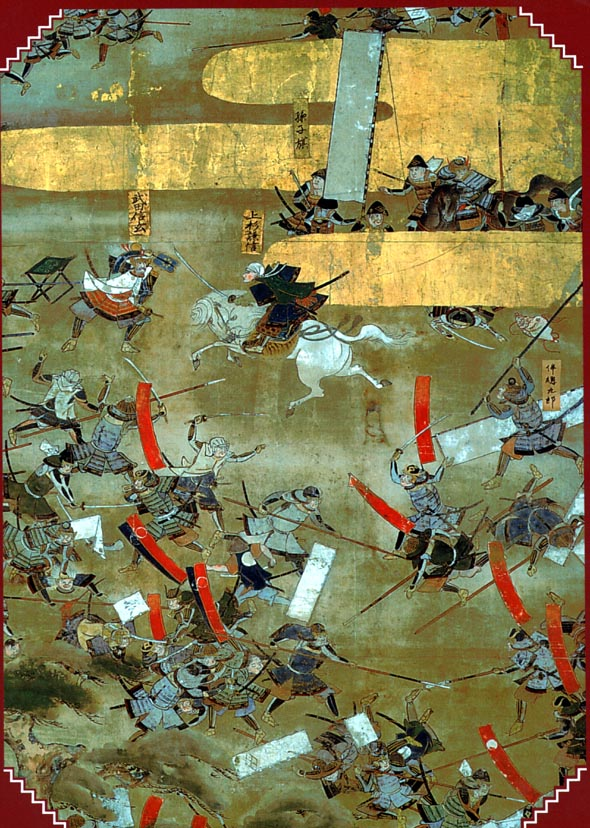
Depiction of the legendary personal conflict between Kenshin and Shingen at the fourth Battle of Kawanakajima (1561)

The Sengoku period is marked by social upheaval, political intrigue and near-constant military conflict. Less than a century after the end of the Nanboku-chō Wars, peace under the relatively weak Ashikaga shōgunate was disrupted by the outbreak of the Ōnin War (1467–1477). This was a civil war between the Ashikaga shōgunate and numerous daimyō. The ancient capital of Kyoto was converted into a battlefield and a heavily fortified city that suffered severe destruction.

The authority of both the shōgunate and the Imperial Court had weakened, and provincial Governors (shugo) and other local samurai leaders emerged as the daimyōs, who battled each other, religious factions (e.g. the Ikkō-ikki), and others for land and power for the next 150 years or so. The period has come to be called the Sengoku period, after the Warring States period in ancient Chinese history. Over one hundred domains clashed and warred throughout the archipelago, as clans rose and fell, boundaries shifted, and some of the largest battles in all of global pre-modern history were fought.

A great many developments and significant events took place during this period, ranging from advances in castle design to the advent of the cavalry charge, the further development of campaign strategies on a grand scale, and the significant changes brought on by the introduction of firearms. The composition of the army changed, with masses of ashigaru, footsoldiers armed with long lances (yari), archers, and, later, gunners serving alongside mounted samurai. Naval battles likewise consisted of little more than using boats to move troops within range of bow or arquebus, and then into hand-to-hand fighting.

The long-standing rivalry between the daimyō Takeda Shingen of Kai Province and Uesugi Kenshin of Echigo Province is considered legendary. The Battles of Kawanakajima between the armies of Shingen and Kenshin (1553–1564) are one of the most cherished tales in Japanese military history and the epitome of Japanese chivalry and romance. They're mentioned in epic literature, woodblock printing and movies.

In the first conflict between Shingen and Kenshin they were very cautious, only committing themselves to indecisive skirmishes. There were a total of five engagements at Kawanakajima. Only the fourth battle was a serious, all-out battle between the two. During the fourth battle, Kenshin's forces cleared a path through the Takeda troops and Kenshin engaged Shingen in single combat. Kenshin attacked Shingen with his sword while Shingen defended with his Japanese war fan (tessen). Both lords lost many men in this fight, and Shingen in particular lost two of his main generals, Yamamoto Kansuke and his younger brother Takeda Nobushige. After the death of Shingen, Tokugawa Ieyasu borrowed heavily from Shingen's governmental and military innovations after he had taken leadership of Kai Province during Toyotomi Hideyoshi's rise to power. Many of these designs were used by the Tokugawa shōgunate.

The Hōjō clan, in and around the Kantō region, were among the first to establish networks of satellite castles, and the complex use of these castles both for mutual defense and coordinated attacks. The Takeda, under Takeda Shingen, developed the Japanese equivalent of the cavalry charge. Though debate continues today as to the force of his charges, and the appropriateness of comparing them to Western cavalry charges, it is evident from contemporary sources that it was a revolutionary development, and powerful against defenders unused to it. The Battles of the Sengoku period of particular interest or significance are too numerous to list here. Suffice to say this period saw a myriad of strategic and tactical developments, and some of the longest sieges and largest battles in the history of the early modern world.

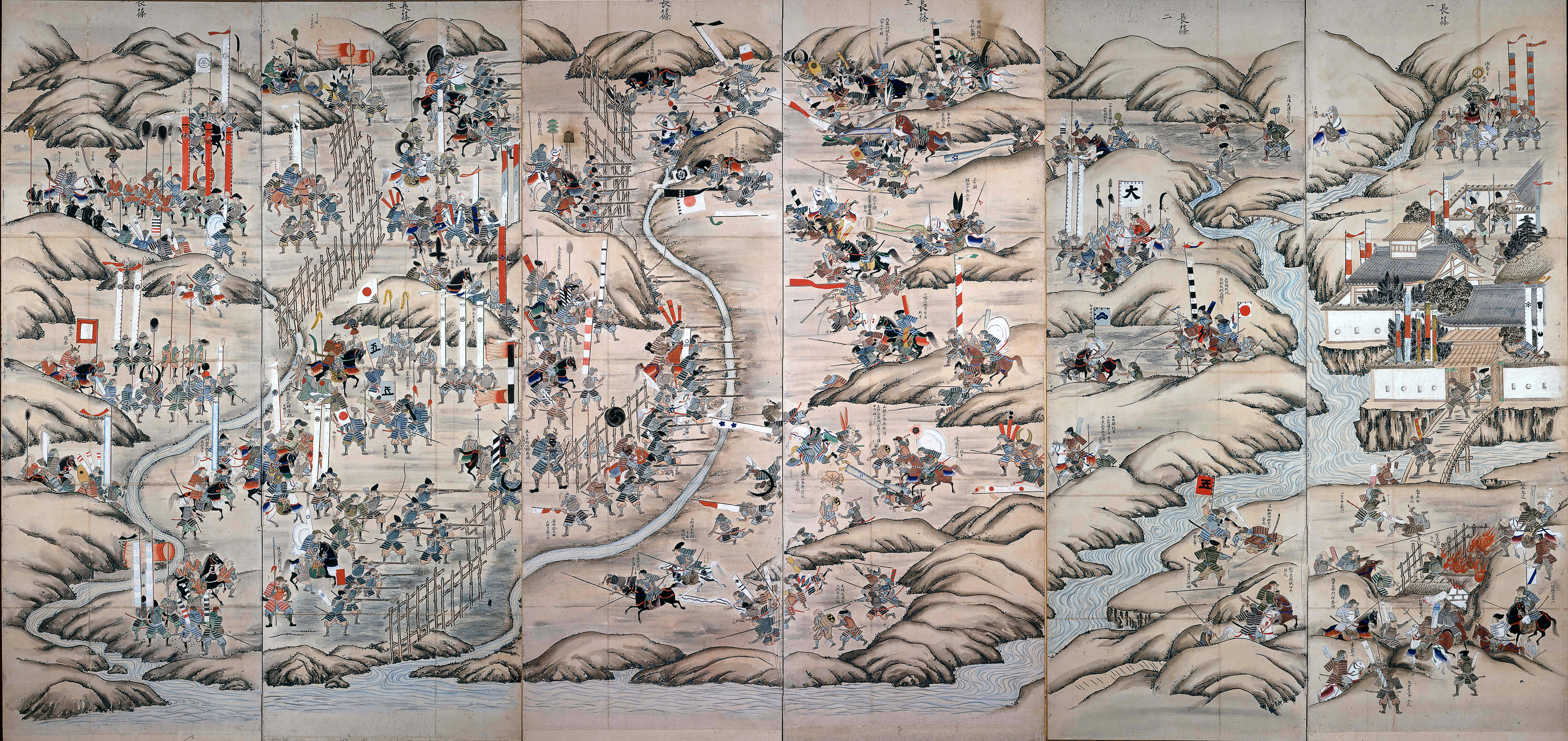
Battle of Nagashino (1575)

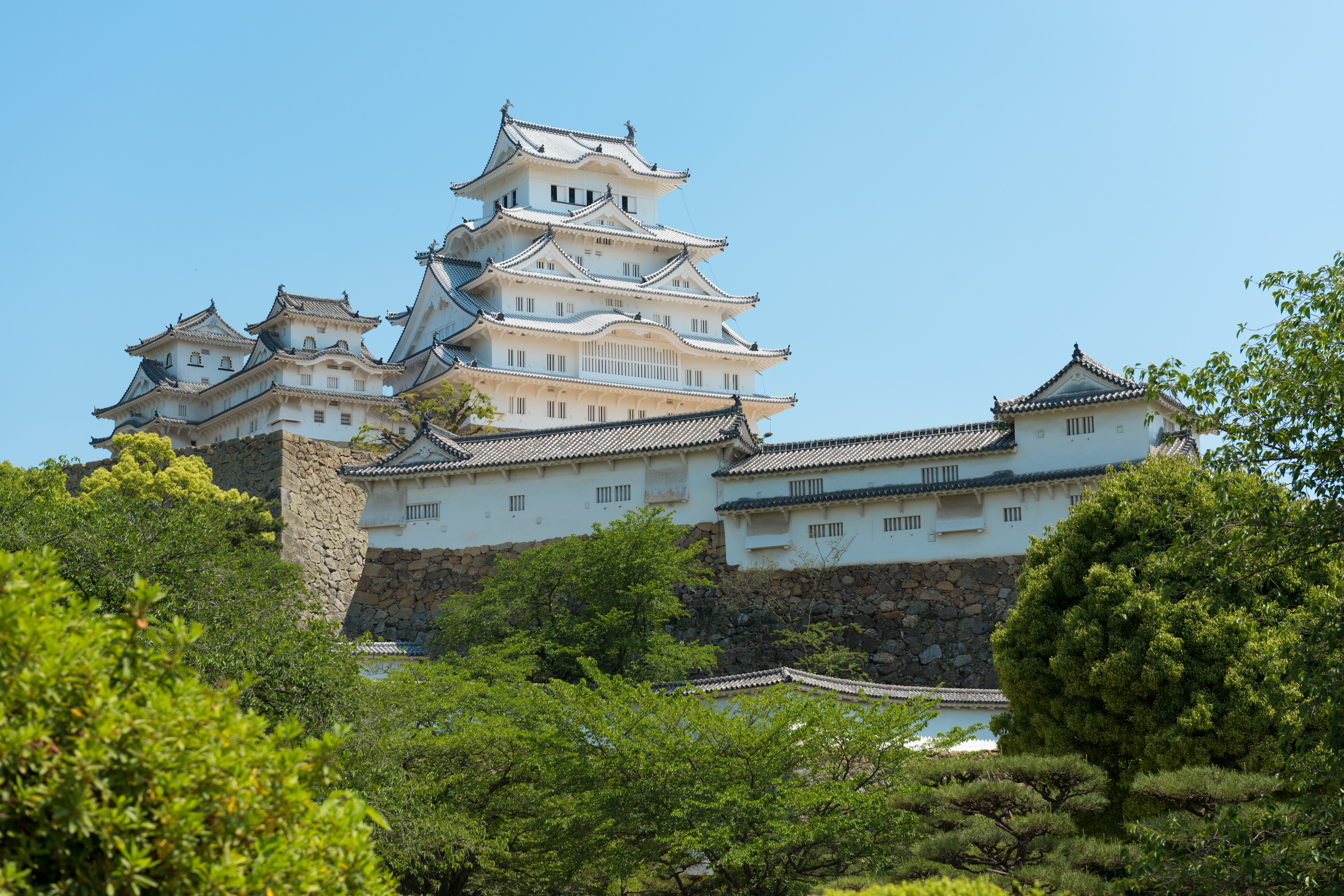
Himeji Castle

==== Azuchi–Momoyama period (1568–1600) ====
This was the final phase of the Sengoku period. It's named for the increasingly important castle-cities, is marked by the introduction of firearms, after contact with the Portuguese, and a further push towards all-out battle, away from individual combats and concepts of personal honor and bravery.

The arquebus was introduced to Japan in 1543, by Portuguese on board a Chinese ship that crashed upon the tiny island of Tanegashima in the southernmost parts of the Japanese archipelago. Though the weapon's introduction was not seen to have particularly dramatic effects for several decades, by the 1560s thousands of gunpowder weapons were in use in Japan, and began to have revolutionary effects upon Japanese tactics, strategy, army compositions, and castle architecture.

The 1575 Battle of Nagashino, in which about 3,000 arquebusiers led by Oda Nobunaga cut down charging ranks of thousands of samurai, remains one of the chief examples of the effect of these weapons. Highly inaccurate, and taking a long time to reload, arquebusses, or hinawa-jū (火縄銃) as they are called in Japanese, did not win battles on their own. Oda Nobunaga, Toyotomi Hideyoshi, and other commanders developed tactics that honed arquebus use to the greatest advantage. At Nagashino, Nobunaga's gunners hid behind wooden barricades, embedded with large wooden spikes to ward off cavalry, and took turns firing volleys and reloading.

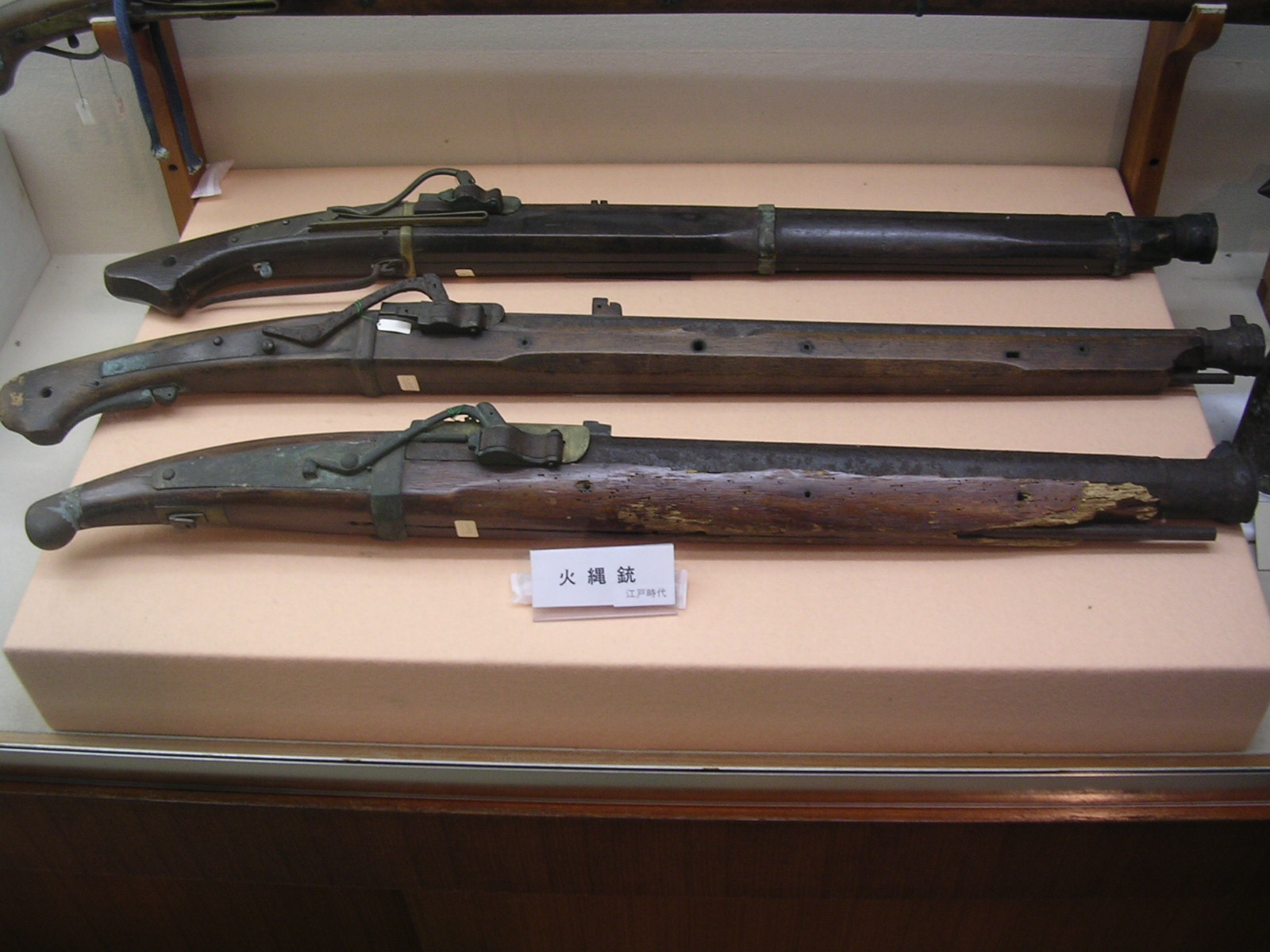
Arquebusses of the Edo period

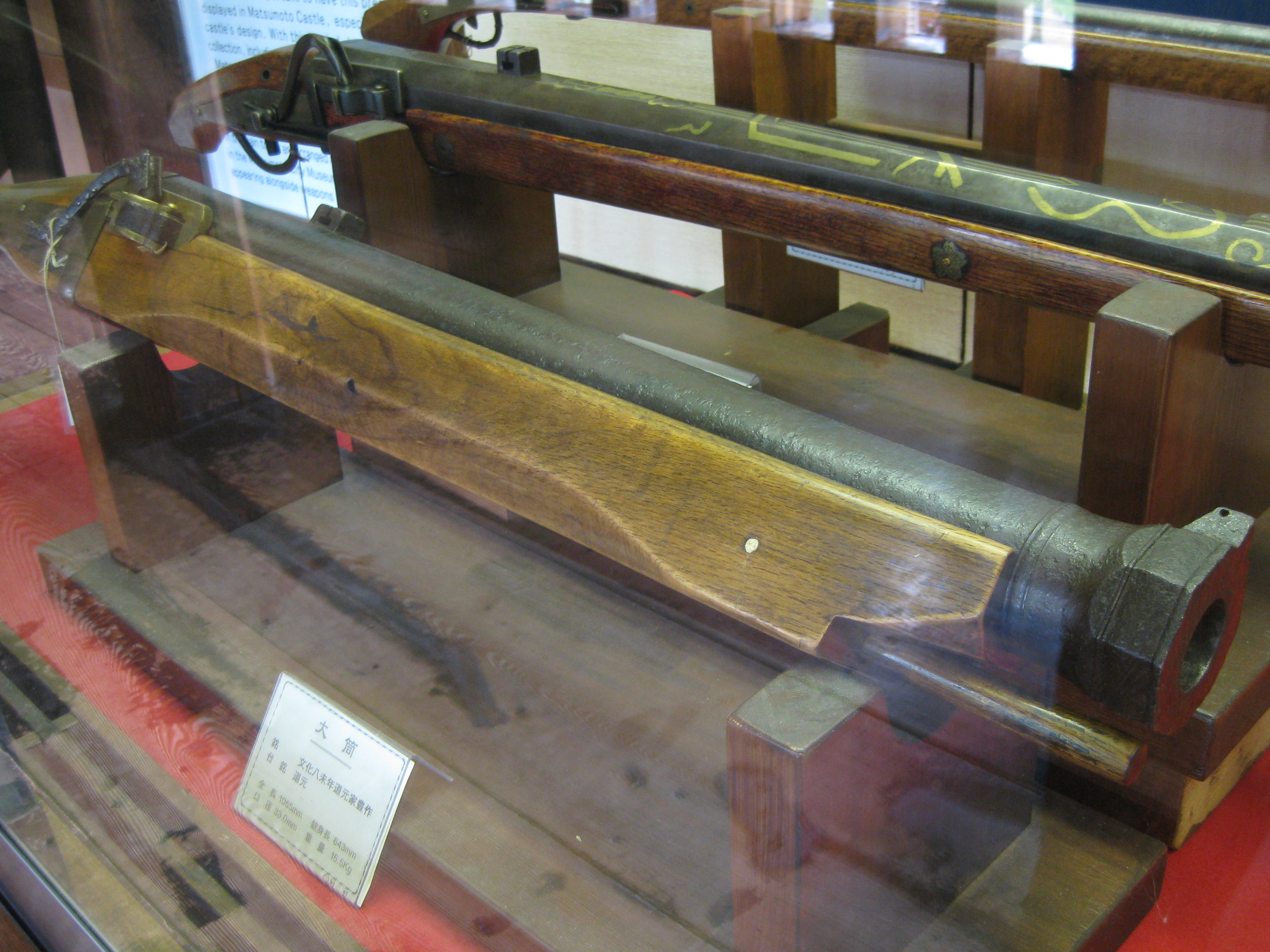

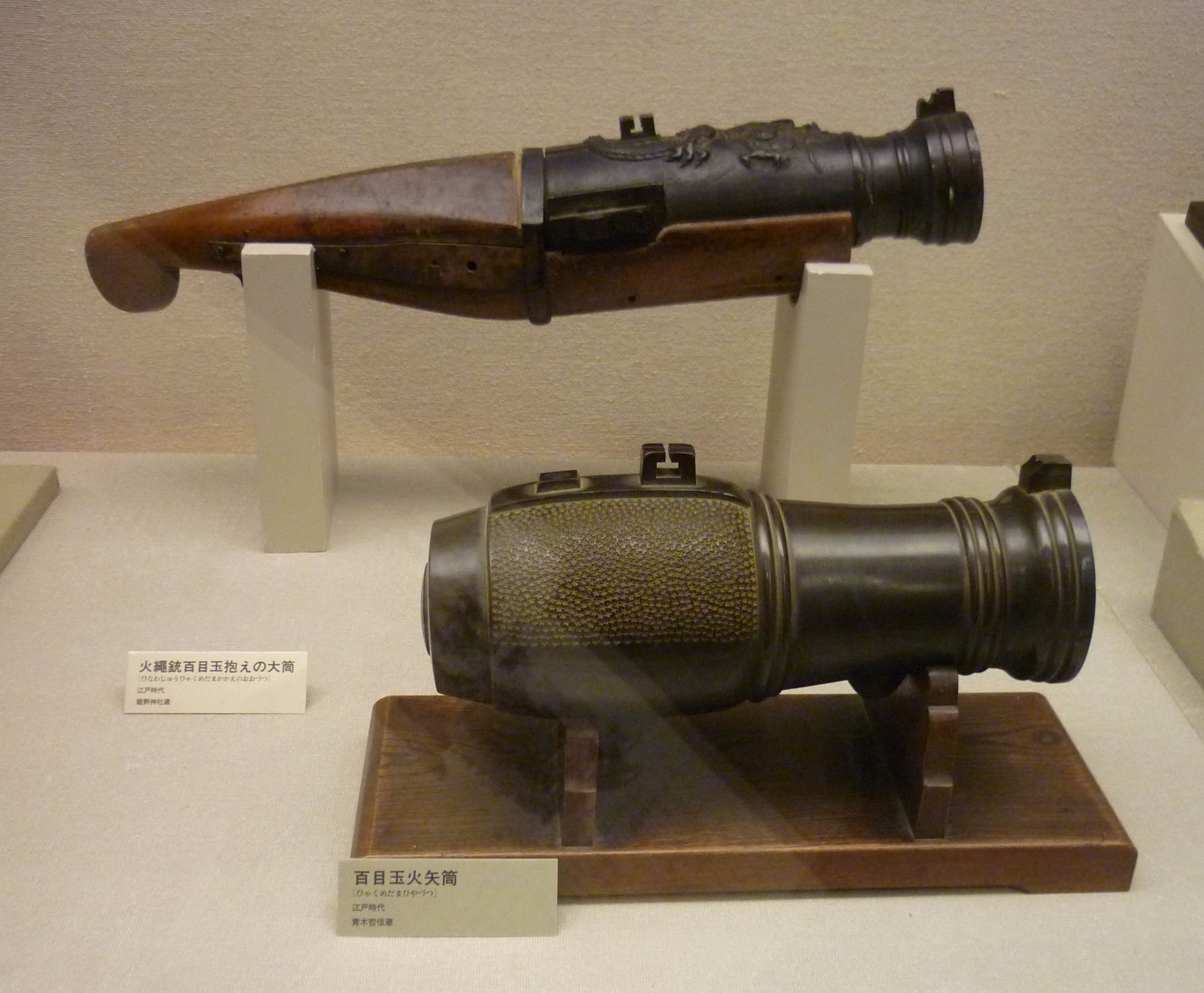

As in Europe, the debilitating effects of wet (and therefore largely useless) gunpowder were decisive in a number of battles. But, one of the key advantages of the weapon was that unlike bows, which required years of training largely available only to the samurai class, guns could be used by relatively untrained footmen. Samurai stuck to their swords and their bows, engaging in cavalry or infantry tactics, while the ashigaru wielded the guns. Some militant Buddhist factions began to produce firearms in foundries normally employed to make bronze temple bells. In this manner, the Ikkō-ikki, a group of monks and lay religious zealots, turned their Ishiyama Honganji cathedral-fortress into some of the most well-defended fortresses in the country. The ikki and a handful of other militant religious factions thus became powers unto themselves, and fought fierce battles against some of the chief generals and samurai clans of the archipelago.

Though civil strife continued to rage as it had for the previous century, the battles growing larger and more tactically complex, it was at this time that the many "warring states" began to be united. There were three powerful daimyō who unified the Japanese archipelago. In the second half of the 16th century, Japan was first fully unified by daimyō Oda Nobunaga and then by Toyotomi Hideyoshi. The third daimyō who unified Japan was Tokugawa Ieyasu after the Battle of Sekigahara in 1600. This resulted in 268 years of uninterrupted rule by the Tokugawa clan.

With an ambition to conquer China's Ming Dynasty, Toyotomi Hideyoshi requested passage through the Korean peninsula from the King of Joseon. Upon being refused, Hideyoshi launched invasions of Korea with an army of 158,800 soldiers between 1592 and 1598. The Japanese army quickly captured several major cities from the unprepared Joseon kingdom including the capital, causing the king to retreat and request military aid from China. With the arrival of the Chinese army, the joint Chinese-Korean troops pushed the Japanese army down to the southeast of the Korean peninsula where a military stalemate was established by 1594. Concurrently, the "Righteous Army" of Korean civilians waged guerilla warfare and Admiral Yi Sun-sin repeatedly disrupted the Japanese supply lines at sea. After Hideyoshi's death, the Council of Five Elders ordered the remaining Japanese forces in Korea to retreat.

The Battle of Sekigahara was the last major battle of the Sengoku period on October 21, 1600. This was a huge battle between the forces loyal to Toyotomi Hideyori versus Tokugawa Ieyasu. Hideyori's Western Army consisted of many clans from Western Japan with a total of 120,000 men. The Eastern Army was 75,000 men strong with clans from Eastern Japan. The decisive victory of the Eastern Army solidified the rule of Tokugawa Ieyasu. In 1603, Ieyasu was appointed with the title of shōgun by Emperor Go-Yōzei. This made Ieyasu the nominal ruler of the whole country of Japan. The Tokugawa shōgunate was the last shōgunate until the Meiji Restoration in 1867.

== Early modern period ==
=== Edo period (1603–1867) ===
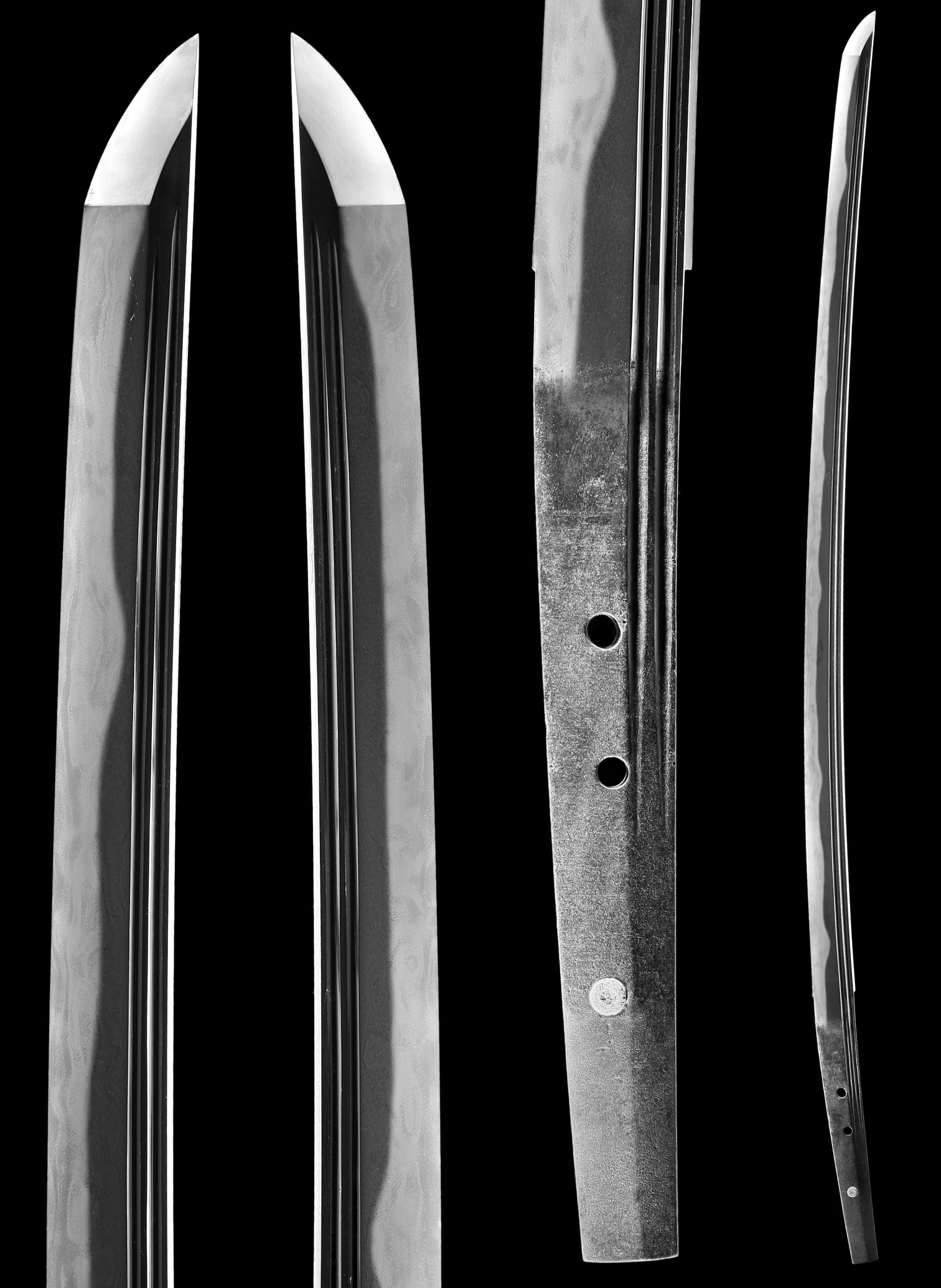
Tachi by Norishige ca. 1300, made ō-suriage (greatly shortened) during the Edo period for use as a "katana" by cutting off the original tang and reforming it higher up the cutting edge

This period was one of relative peace under the authority of the Tokugawa shōgunate, a forced peace that was maintained through a variety of measures that weakened the daimyōs and ensured their loyalty to the shōgunate. Since 1660, Japan had 200 years of peace with no major domestic or foreign conflicts. The Tokugawa peace was ruptured only rarely and briefly prior to the violence that surrounded the Meiji Restoration of the 1860s.

The lack of warfare caused the samurai to increasingly become courtiers, bureaucrats, and administrators rather than warriors. The conduct of samurai served as role-model behavior for the other social classes.

Miyamoto Musashi was one of the most famous Japanese swordsman, philosopher, strategist, writer and rōnin who lived from 1584 to 1645. He became the Kensei (sword saint) of Japan. He had a unique double-bladed swordsmanship (Nito-Ichi-ryū) and an undefeated record in 61 duels. He wrote the classic Japanese martial arts literature The Book of Five Rings and Dokkōdō (The Path of Aloneness).

The Tokugawa shōgunate enforced the policy of Sakoku ("closed country"), which prohibited most foreign contact and trade between 1641 and 1853. Under the policy, most foreign nationals were barred from entering Japan and common Japanese people couldn't leave. By restricting the daimyōs' ability to trade with foreign ships coming to Japan or pursue trade opportunities overseas, the Tokugawa shōgunate could ensure none would become powerful enough to challenge its supremacy.

The Siege of Osaka, which took place in 1614–1615, was essentially the last gasp for Toyotomi Hideyori, heir to Hideyoshi, and an alliance of clans and other elements who opposed the shōgunate. A samurai battle on a grand scale, in terms of strategy, scale, methods employed, and the political causes behind it, this is widely considered the final conflict of the Sengoku period.

Outside of the siege of Osaka, and the later conflicts of the 1850s to 1860s, violence in the Edo period was restricted to small skirmishes in the streets, peasant rebellions, and the enforcement of maritime restrictions. Social tension in the Edo period brought a number of rebellions and uprisings, the largest of which was the 1638 Shimabara Rebellion. In the far north of the country, the island of Hokkaido was inhabited by Ainu villagers and Japanese settlers. In 1669, an Ainu leader led a revolt against the Matsumae clan who controlled the region, and it was the last major uprising against Japanese control of the region. It was put down in 1672. In 1789, another Ainu revolt, the Menashi–Kunashir Rebellion, was crushed.

The Bakumatsu were the final years of the Tokugawa shōgunate and the isolationist Sakoku policy between 1853 and 1867. The appearance of gunboat diplomacy in Japan in the 1850s, and the forced so-called "opening of Japan" by Western forces, underscored the weakness of the shōgunate and led to its collapse. Though the actual end of the shōgunate and establishment of an Imperial Western-style government was handled peacefully, through political petitions and other methods, the years surrounding the event were not entirely bloodless. Following the formal termination of the shōgunate, the Boshin War (戊辰戦争, Boshin Sensō; "War of the Year of the Yang Earth Dragon") was fought in 1868–1869 between the Tokugawa army and a number of factions of nominally pro-Imperial forces.

== Modern period ==
Since the first visit of Commodore Perry to Edo Bay in July 1853, Japan lacked industrial and military power to prevent western coercion with unequal treaties that took advantage of Japan. Japan had antiquated and decentralized military forces. The feudal lords were pressured into signing multiple treaties with the Americans known as "The Unequal Treaties".

Thereafter in 1853 six island fortifications with cannon batteries were built at Odaiba in Edo Bay by Egawa Hidetatsu for the Tokugawa shōgunate. The purpose was to protect Edo from another American incursion. Thereafter Industrial developments started in order to build modern cannons. A reverbatory furnace was established by Egawa Hidetatsu in Nirayama to cast cannons. It was completed in 1857.

Japan was determined to avoid the fate of other Asian countries which were colonized by western imperial powers. The Japanese people and the government with Emperor Meiji realized that in order to preserve the independence of Japan it had to modernize to become an equal of the western colonial powers. In 1868 Tokugawa Yoshinobu resigned which ended the Tokugawa dynasty and the last shōgunate. The Meiji Restoration restored practical abilities and the political system under Emperor Meiji. This caused enormous change in Japan's political and social structure from the late Edo period to the early Meiji period. Japan set out to "gather wisdom from all over the world" and embarked on an ambitious program of military, social, political, and economic reforms. Japan quickly transformed in one generation from an isolated feudal society to a modern industrialized nation state and an emerging great power.

After a long period of peace, Japan quickly rearmed and modernized by importing western weapons, then manufacturing them domestically, and finally by manufacturing weapons of Japanese design. In 1902, it became the first Asian nation to sign a mutual defense pact with a European nation, Britain. During the Russo-Japanese War (1904–1905), Japan became the first modern Asian nation to win a war against a European nation.

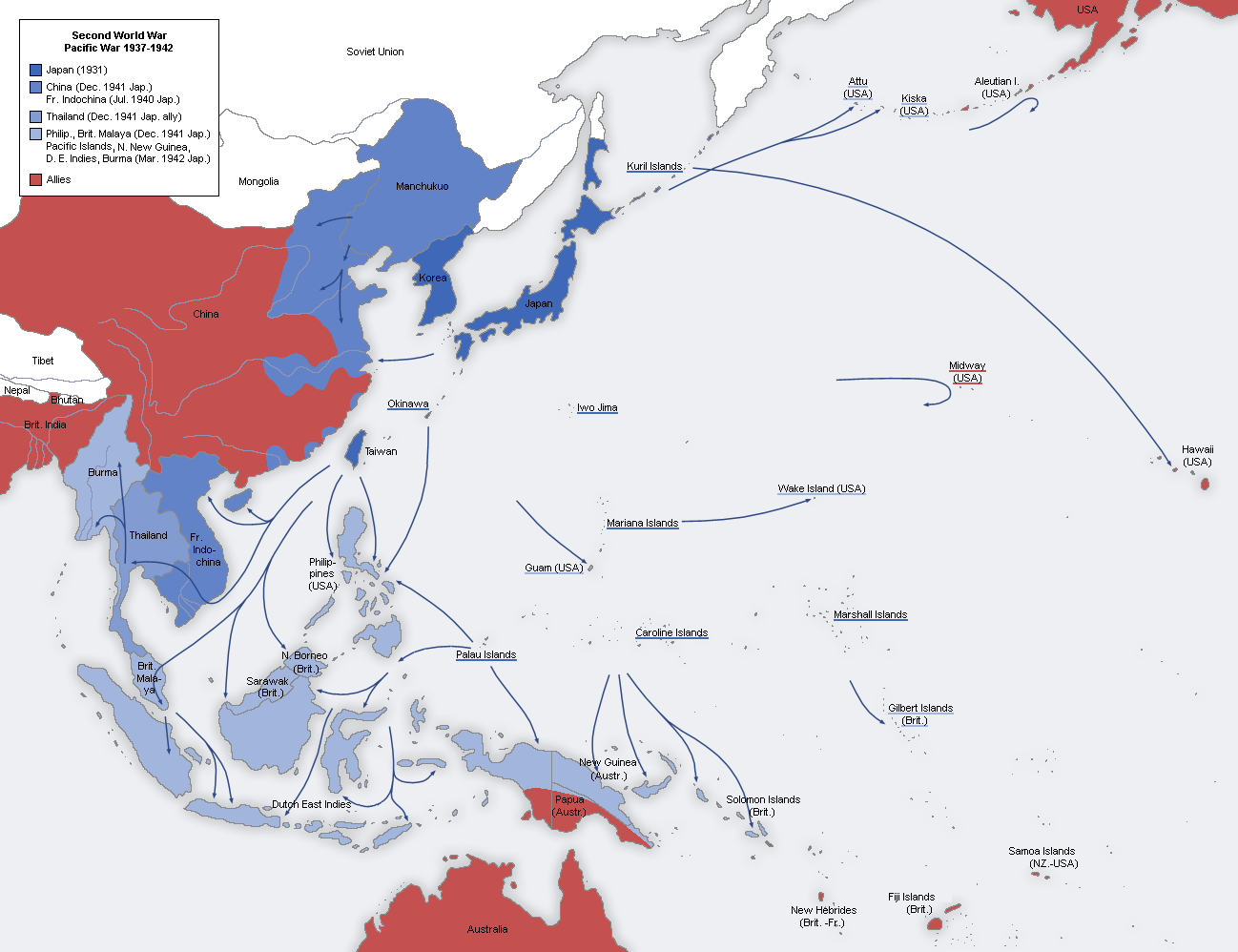
A map of the Japanese advance from 1937 to 1942

Japan was influenced by Western imperialism in Asia which caused Japan to participate as a colonial power. Japan was the last major power to enter the race for global colonization. It expanded rapidly, with colonial acquisitions, from 1895 till 1942. The Empire of Japan was one of the largest in history. It included colonies in Manchuria, China, Indonesia, the Philippines, Malaysia, Papua New Guinea, Indochina, Burma and many Pacific islands. In 1937, Japan had one-sixth the industrial capacity than the USA. The Japanese industry was dependent on the shipment of raw materials from Japan's overseas territories and foreign imports. A series of increasingly stringent economic embargoes on raw materials by the United States such as the Japanese Oil Embargo (1940–1941) pushed the Empire of Japan into conflict with the United States.

=== Meiji era (1868–1912) ===
==== Modern army established ====
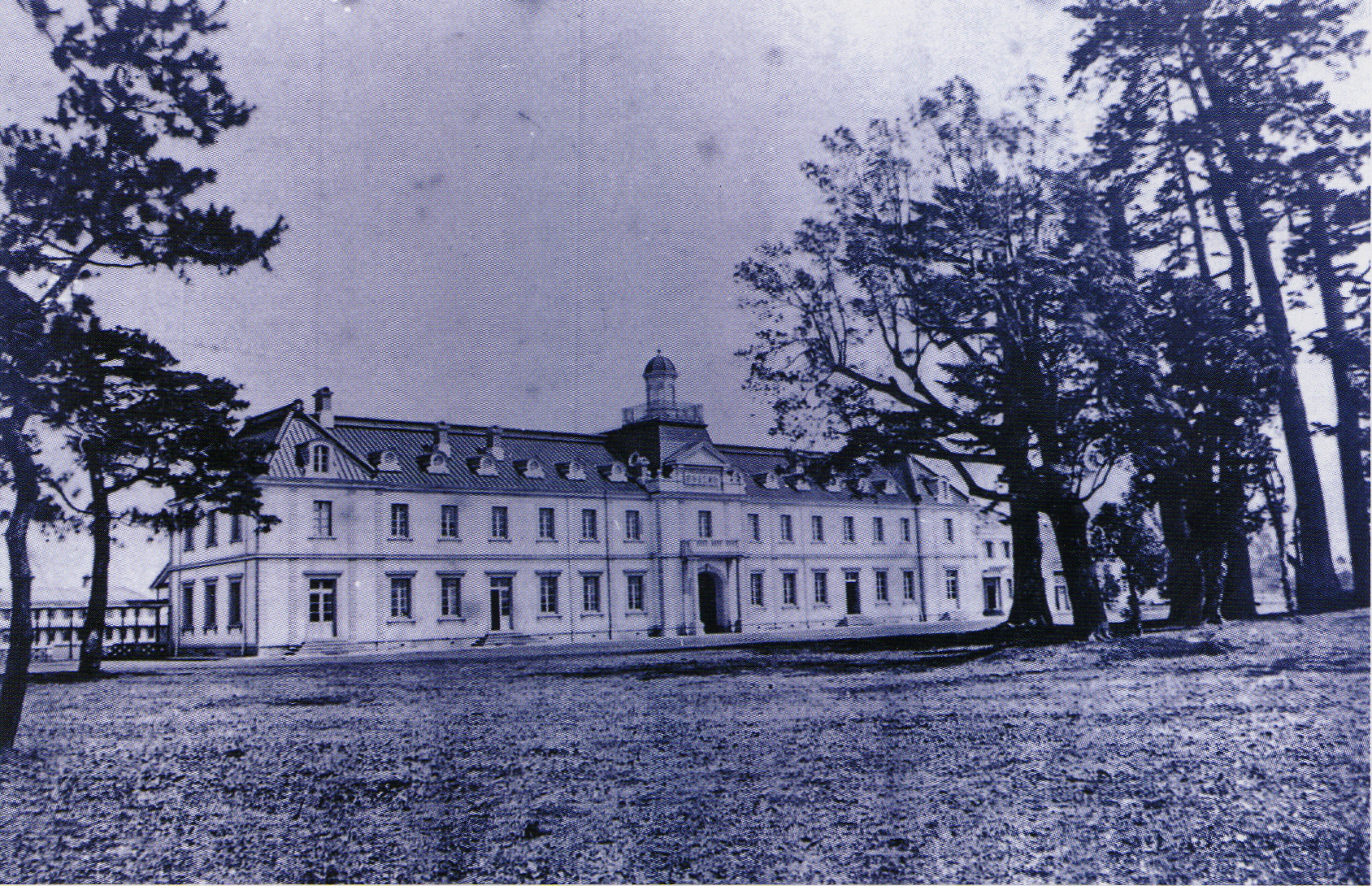
Imperial Japanese Army Academy in Ichigaya, Tokyo (1874)

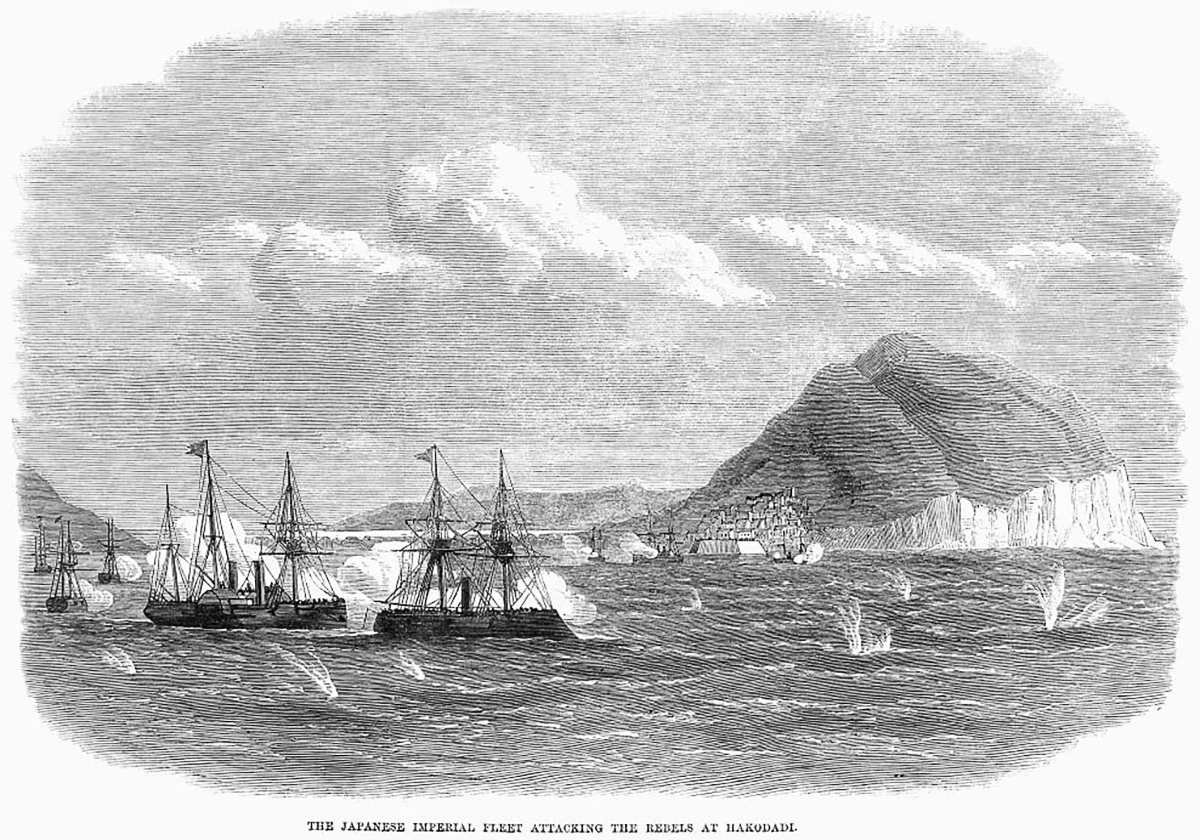
The Naval Battle of Hakodate Bay, May 1869. In the foreground, Kasuga and Kōtetsu of the Imperial Japanese Navy

In the mid-19th century Japan did not have a unified national army. The country consisted of feudal domains (han) with the Tokugawa shōgunate (bakufu) in overall control since 1603. The bakufu army was a large force, but only one among others. The Shōgunate's efforts to control the nation depended upon the cooperation of its vassal Daimyōs' armies.

From 1867, Japan requested various Western military missions in order to help Japan to modernize its armed forces. The first foreign military mission in Japan was held by France in 1867.

On 29 June 1869 Emperor Meiji founded a Shinto shrine called Tōkyō Shōkonsha in Kudan, Tokyo (present-day Chiyoda, Tokyo). It was established in the wake of the Boshin War (1868–1869) to honor those who died for the Emperor. It was renamed to Yasukuni Shrine by the Emperor in 1879 which literally means "Pacifying the Nation". The Emperor wrote a poem "I assure those of you who fought and died for your country that your names will live forever at this shrine in Musashino." The Yasukuni Shrine commemorates the honor and achievements of the millions of men, women, children and pets who died in service of Japan from the Boshin War to the First Indochina War (1946–1954). Later the shrine would include the worship of all who died serving in wars involving Japan since 1853 such as the Taishō and Shōwa period.

In 1871, the politicians Iwakura Tomomi and Ōkubo Toshimichi led the organization of a national army. It consisted exclusively of 10,000 strong samurai. Ōkubo was also a samurai of Satsuma and he was one of the Three Great Nobles of the Restoration and one of the main founders of modern Japan.

In 1873, the Imperial government asked the newly appointed War Minister Yamagata Aritomo (山縣 有朋; 14 June 1838 – 1 February 1922) to organize a national army for Japan. So Yamagata convinced the government and enacted a conscription law in 1873 which established the new Imperial Japanese Army. The law established military service for males of all classes, for a duration of 3 years, with an additional 4 years in the reserve. Yamagata modernized and modeled it after the Prussian Army. Duke Yamagata Aritomo was born in a lower ranked samurai family from Hagi. He was a field marshal in the Imperial Japanese Army and twice Prime Minister of Japan. He was one of the main architects of the military and political foundations of early modern Japan. Yamagata Aritomo is regarded as the father of Japanese militarism.

The principal officer training school for the Imperial Japanese Army was established as the Heigakkō in Kyoto in 1868. It was renamed in 1874 to the Imperial Japanese Army Academy (陸軍士官学校, Rikugun Shikan Gakkō) and relocated to Ichigaya, Tokyo. The second Army Academy was built by the second French Military Mission to Japan. The inauguration was in 1875. This was an important Military Academy for Japanese Army officers. It is on the same ground as the modern Japan Ministry of Defense. The second French Military Mission also helped reorganize the Imperial Japanese Army, and establish the first draft law (January 1873).

Class distinctions were mostly eliminated during modernization to create a representative democracy. The samurai lost their status as the only class with military privileges. However, during the Meiji period, most leaders in Japanese society (politics, business and military) were ex-samurai or descendants of samurai. They shared a set of values and outlooks that supported Japanese militarism. Thus the military class that began with the samurai in 1192 AD continued to rule Japan.

The Constitution of the Empire of Japan was enacted on 29 November 1890. It was a form of mixed constitutional and absolute monarchy. The Emperor of Japan was legally the supreme leader, and the Cabinet were his followers. The Prime Minister would be elected by a Privy Council. In reality, the Emperor was head of state but the Prime Minister was the actual head of government.

==== Sino-Japanese War (1894–1895) ====
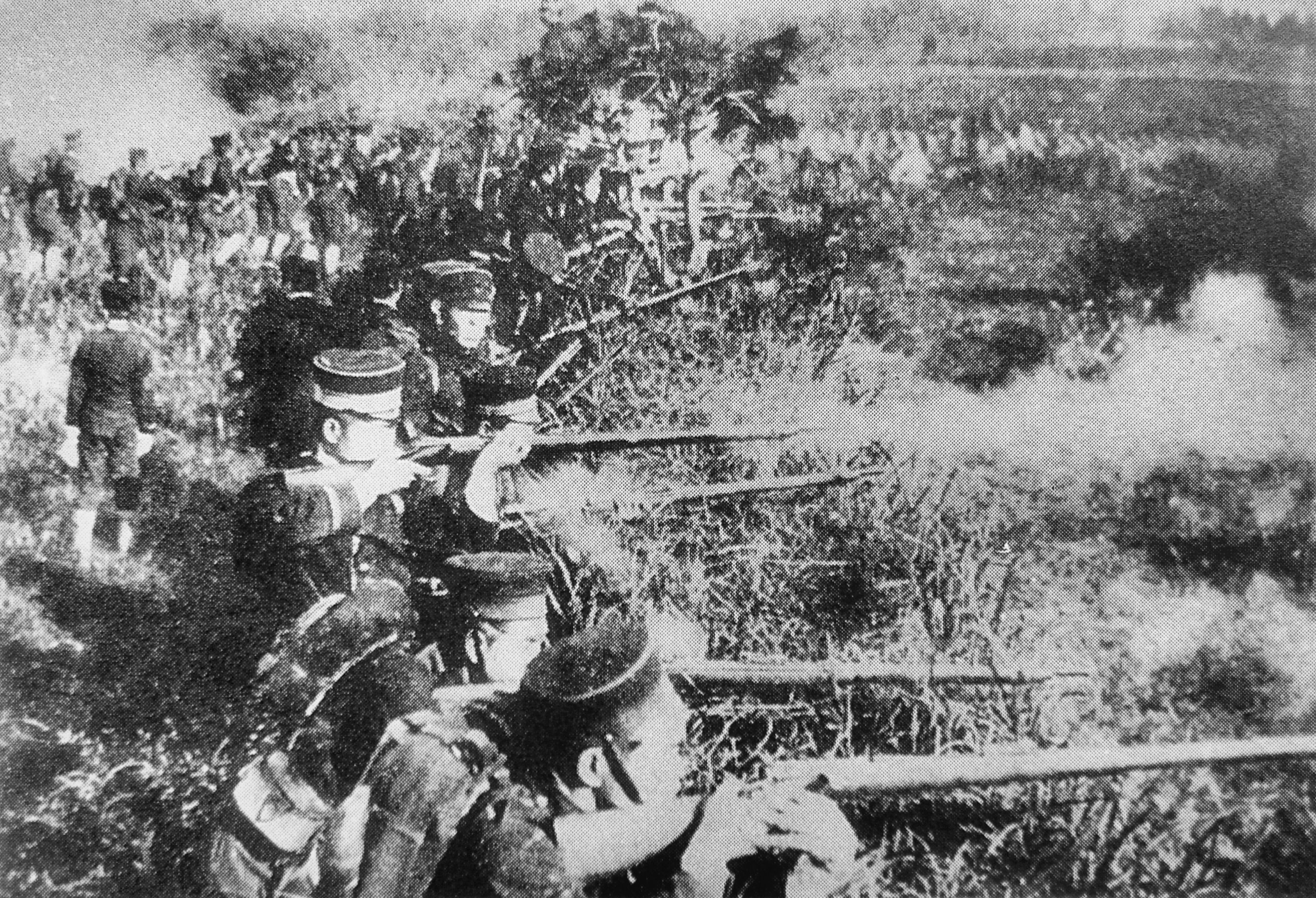
Imperial Japanese Army infantry firing their Murata rifles (1894)

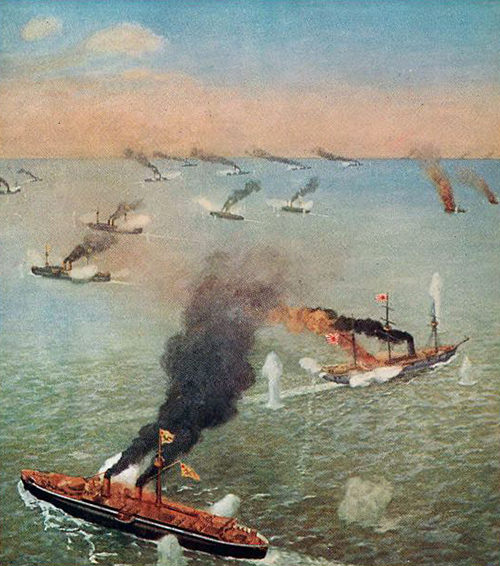
The Battle of the Yalu River (1894)

The Sino-Japanese War was fought against the forces of the Qing dynasty of China in the Korean Peninsula, Manchuria, and the coast of China. It was the first major conflict between Japan and an overseas military power in modern times.

The conflict was primarily over influence in Korea. After more than six months of unbroken successes by Japanese land and naval forces and the loss of the port of Weihaiwei, the Qing government sued for peace in February 1895.

The war demonstrated the failure of the Qing dynasty's attempts to modernize its military and fend off threats to its sovereignty, especially when compared with Japan's successful Meiji Restoration. For the first time, regional dominance in East Asia shifted from China to Japan; The prestige of the Qing Dynasty, along with the classical tradition in China, suffered a major blow. The Qing's loss of Korea as a tributary state sparked an unprecedented public outcry. Throughout most of history Korea was a tributary state and vassal state of multiple Chinese dynasties. Japan's victory of the First Sino-Japanese War put Korea completely under Japanese control. Korea became a Japanese vassal state.

The Treaty of Shimonoseki (下関条約, Shimonoseki Jyoyaku) signed between Japan and China ended the war. Through this treaty, Japan forced China to open ports for international trade and cede the southern portion of China's Liaoning province as well as the island of Taiwan to Japan. China also had to pay a war indemnity of 200 million Kuping taels. As a result of this war, Korea ceased to be a tributary state of China, but fell into Japan's sphere of influence. However, many of the material gains from this war were lost by Japan due to the Triple Intervention. Korea was fully annexed by Japan with the Japan–Korea Treaty of 1910 signed by Ye Wanyong, Prime Minister of Korea, and Terauchi Masatake, who became the first Japanese Governor-General of Korea.

==== Japanese invasion of Taiwan (1895) ====
The Japanese occupation of Taiwan was strongly resisted by various interests on the island, and was only completed after a full-scale military campaign requiring the commitment of the Imperial Guards Division and most of the 2nd and 4th Provincial Divisions. The campaign began in late May 1895 with a Japanese landing at Keelung, on the northern coast of Taiwan, and ended in October 1895 with the Japanese capture of Tainan, the capital of the self-styled Republic of Formosa. The Japanese defeated regular Chinese and Formosan formations relatively easily but their marching columns were often harassed by guerillas. The Japanese responded with brutal reprisals, and sporadic resistance to their occupation of Taiwan continued until 1902.

==== The Boxer Rebellion ====
The Eight-Nation Alliance was an international military coalition set up in response to the Boxer Rebellion in the Qing Empire of China. The eight nations were the Empire of Japan, the Russian Empire, the British Empire, the French Third Republic, the United States, the German Empire, the Kingdom of Italy and the Austro-Hungarian Empire. In the summer of 1900, when the extra-jurisdictional international legations in Beijing came under attack by Boxer rebels supported by the Qing government, the coalition dispatched their armed forces, in the name of "humanitarian intervention", to defend their respective nations' citizens, as well as a number of Chinese Christians who had taken shelter in the legations. The incident ended with a coalition victory and the signing of the Boxer Protocol.

==== Russo-Japanese War ====
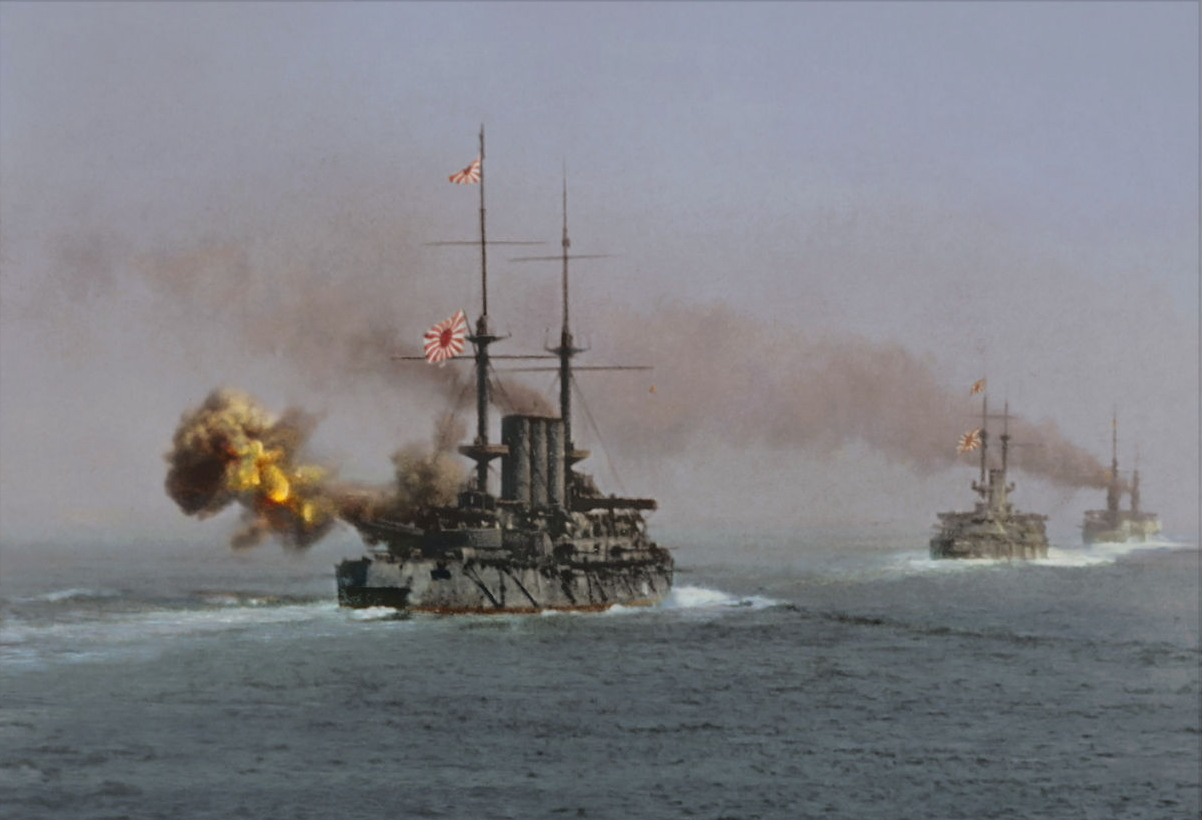
Japanese pre-dreadnought battleship Shikishima (1904)

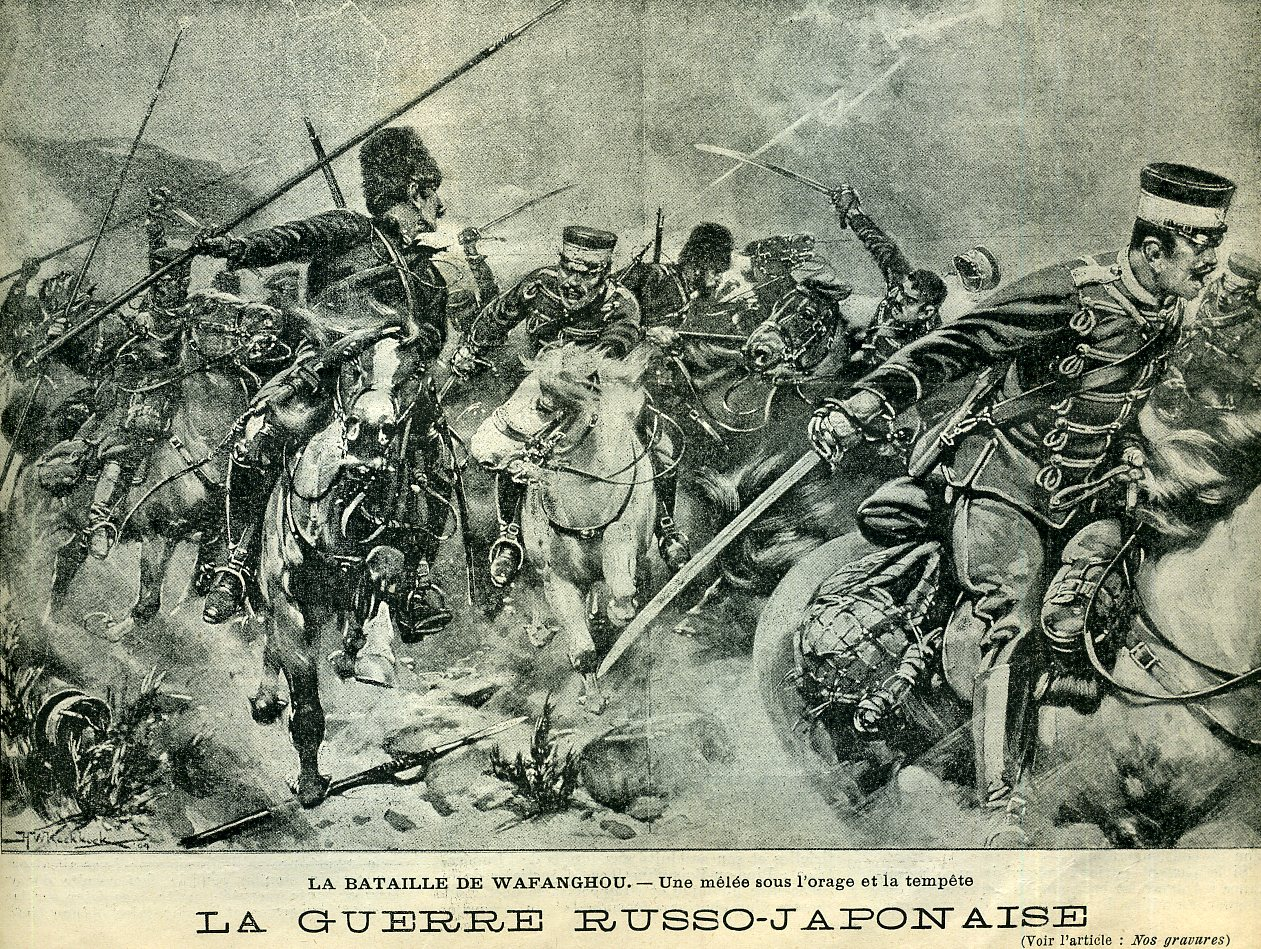
Cavalry combat between the Japanese and Russian army

Following the First Sino-Japanese War (1894–1895), and the humiliation of the forced return of the Liaotung peninsula to China under Russian pressure (the "Triple Intervention"), Japan began to build up its military strength in preparation for further confrontations. Japan promulgated a ten-year naval build-up program, under the slogan "Perseverance and determination" (Jp:臥薪嘗胆, Gashinshoutan), in which it commissioned 109 warships, for a total of 200,000 tons, and increased its Navy personnel from 15,100 to 40,800.

These dispositions culminated with the Russo-Japanese War (1904–1905). The battleship Mikasa was the flagship of admiral Tōgō Heihachirō. At the Battle of Tsushima, the Mikasa with Admiral Tōgō led the Combined Fleet of the Imperial Japanese Navy into what has been called "the most decisive naval battle in history". The Russian fleet was almost completely annihilated: out of 38 Russian ships, 21 were sunk, 7 captured, 6 disarmed, 4,545 Russian servicemen died and 6,106 were taken prisoner. On the other hand, the Japanese only lost 117 men and 3 torpedo boats. This overwhelming victory made admiral Tōgō one of Japan's greatest naval heroes.

The Japanese victory in the Russo-Japanese War of 1904–1905 marks the emergence of Japan as a major military power. Japan demonstrated that it could apply Western technology, discipline, strategy, and tactics effectively. The war concluded with the Treaty of Portsmouth. The complete victory of the Japanese military surprised world observers. The consequences transformed the balance of power in East Asia.

The Battle of Yalu River was the first major land battle during the Russo-Japanese War from 30 April to 1 May 1904. It was also the first victory in decades of an Asian power over a European power. It marked Russia's inability to match Japan's military prowess.

Western powers viewed Japan's victory over Russia as the emergence of a new Asian regional power. With the Russian defeat, some scholars have argued that the war had set in motion a change in the global world order with the emergence of Japan as not only a regional power, but rather, the main Asian power.

=== Taishō era and World War I (1912–1926) ===
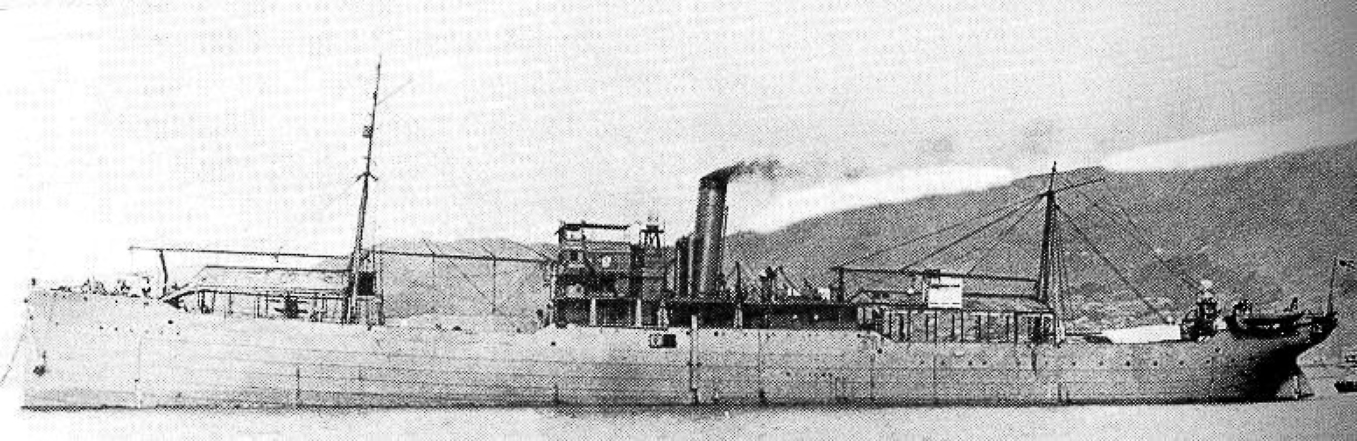
The Japanese seaplane carrier Wakamiya conducted the world's first sea-launched air raids in September 1914.

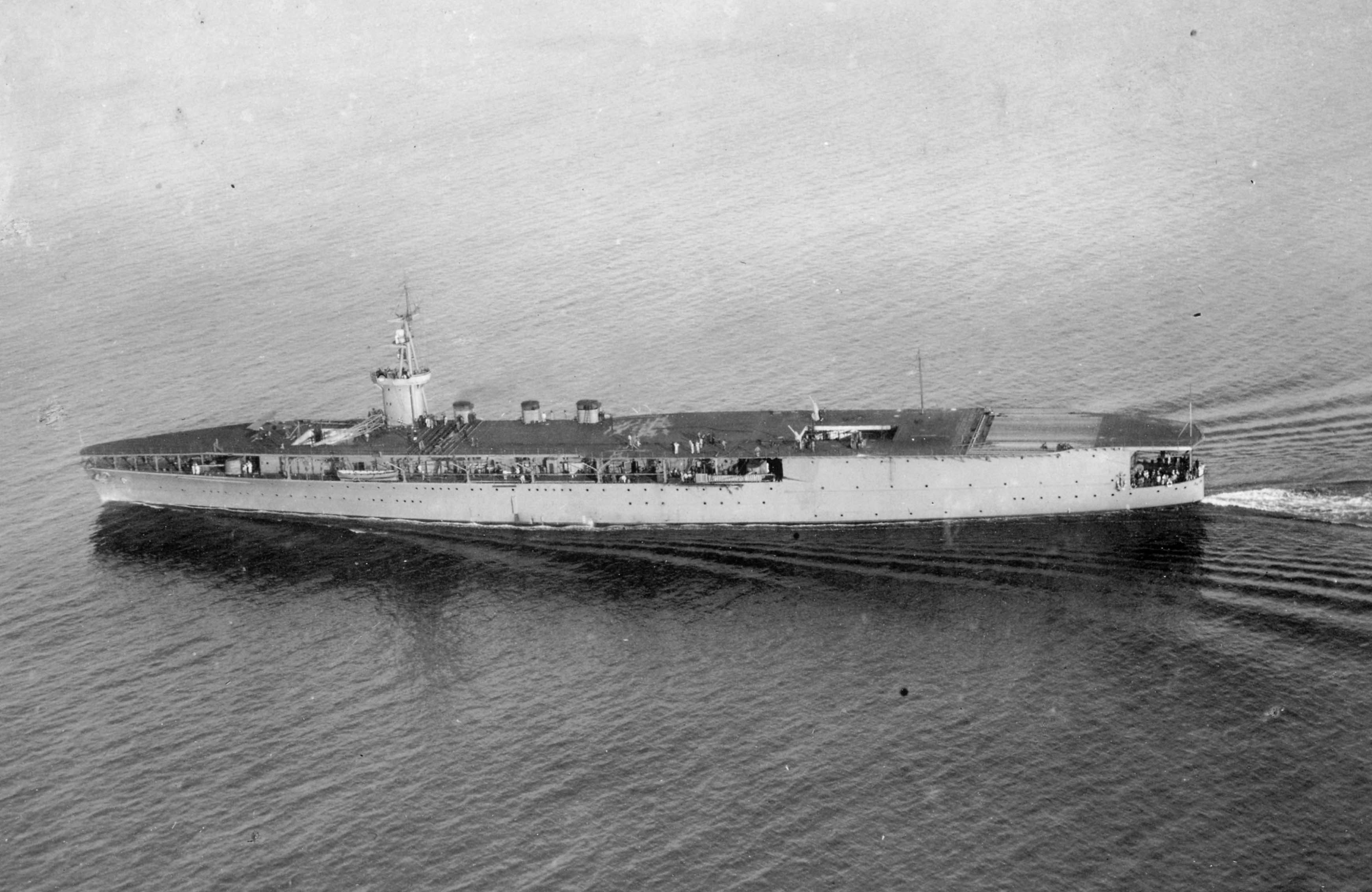
Japanese aircraft carrier Hōshō (1922) was the first commissioned ship that was designed and built as an aircraft carrier.

The Empire of Japan was a member of the Allies during World War I. As an ally of Great Britain, Japan declared war on Germany in 1914. Japan quickly seized the German island colonies of the Mariana Islands, Caroline Islands and Marshall Islands in the Pacific.

The Japanese seaplane carrier Wakamiya conducted the world's first successful naval-launched air raids on 5 September 1914 and during the first months of World War I from Jiaozhou Bay off Qingdao. On 6 September 1914 was the very first air-sea battle in history. A Farman aircraft launched by Wakamiya attacked the Austro-Hungarian cruiser Kaiserin Elisabeth and the German gunboat Jaguar off Qingdao. Four seaplanes bombarded German land targets. The Germans surrendered on 6 November 1914.

During the Russian Civil War the Allied Powers intervened in Russia. The Empire of Japan sent the largest military force of 70,000 soldiers to the eastern region. They supported anti-communist White forces in Russia. The Allied Powers withdrew in 1920. The Japanese military stayed until 1925 following the signing of the Soviet–Japanese Basic Convention. A small group of Japanese cruisers and destroyers also participated in various missions in the Indian Ocean and Mediterranean Sea.

In 1921, during the Interwar period, Japan developed and launched the Hōshō, which was the first purpose-designed aircraft carrier in the world. (Note: HMS Argus pre-dated Hōshō and had a long landing deck, but was designed and initially built as an ocean liner. The first purpose-designed aircraft carrier to be laid down was HMS Hermes in 1918 but she was completed after Hōshō.) Japan subsequently developed a fleet of aircraft carriers that was second to none.

=== Shōwa era and World War II (1926–1945) ===
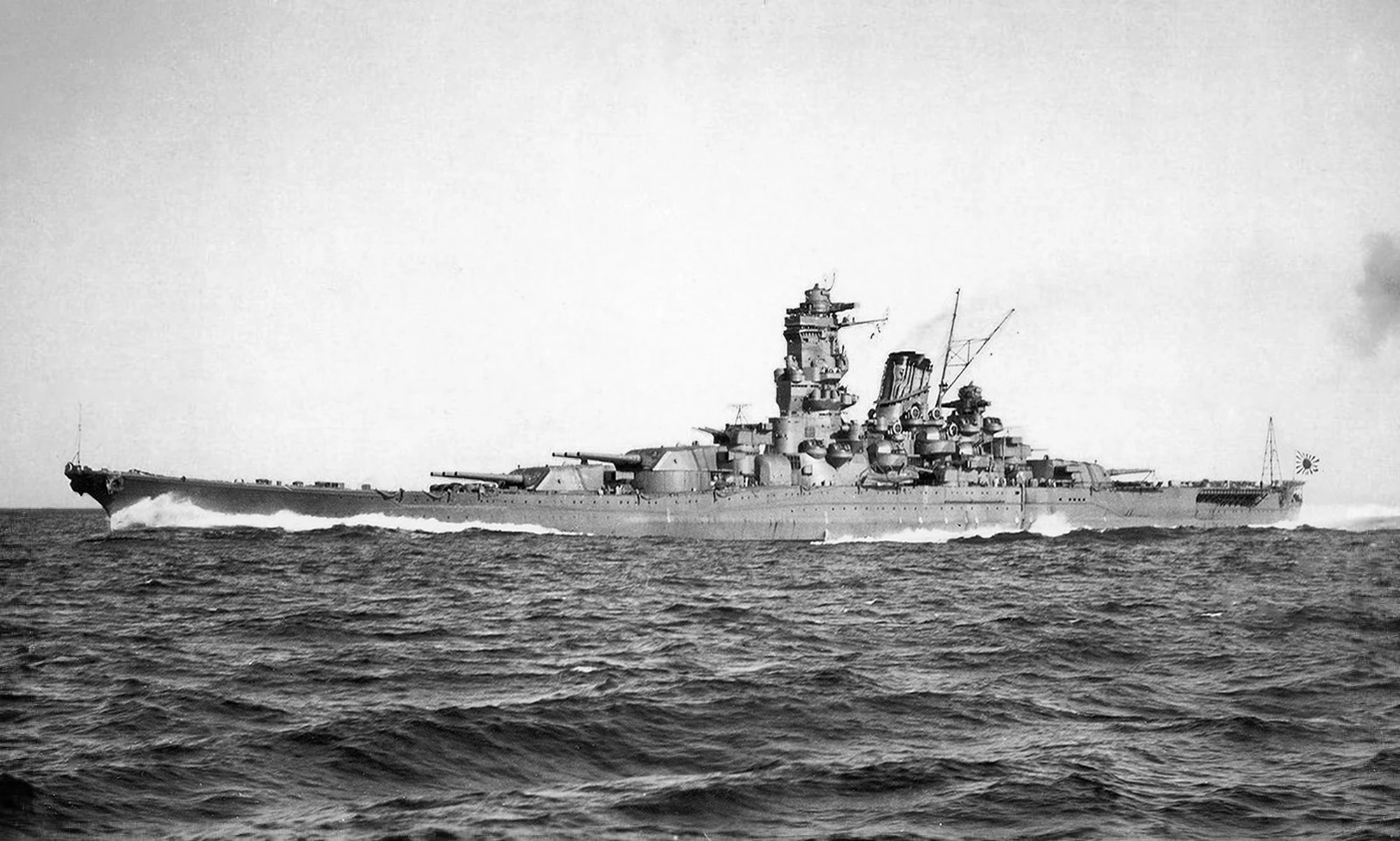
Japanese battleship Yamato on trials in 1941

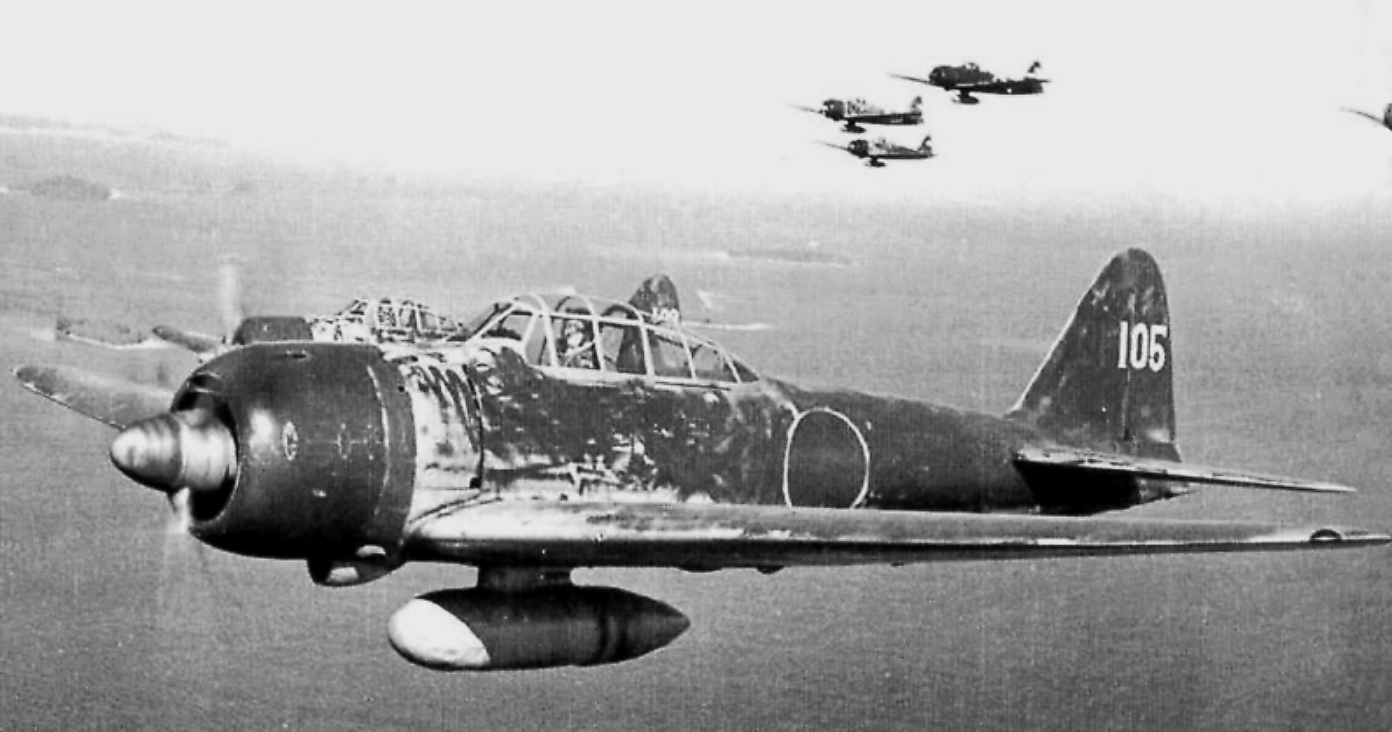
A6M3 Zero Model 22, flown by Japanese ace Hiroyoshi Nishizawa over the Solomon Islands, 1943

Already controlling the area along the South Manchuria Railroad, Japan's Kwantung Army further invaded Manchuria (Northeast China) in 1931, following the Mukden Incident, in which Japan claimed to have had territory attacked by the Chinese. By 1937, Japan had annexed territory north of Beijing and, following the Marco Polo Bridge Incident, a full-scale invasion of China began. Japanese military superiority over a weak and demoralized Chinese Republican army allowed for swift advances down the eastern coast, leading to the fall of Shanghai and Nanjing (the then capital of the Republic of China) the same year. The Chinese suffered greatly in both military and civilian casualties. An estimated 300,000 civilians were killed during the first weeks of Japanese occupation of Nanjing, during the Nanjing Massacre.

In September 1940, Nazi Germany, Fascist Italy, and Imperial Japan became allies under the Tripartite Pact. Germany, which had previously trained and supplied the Chinese army, halted all Sino-German cooperation, and recalled its military advisor (Alexander von Falkenhausen). In July 1940, the U.S. banned the shipment of aviation gasoline to Japan, while Imperial Japanese Army invaded French Indochina and occupied its naval and air bases in September 1940.

In April 1941, the Empire of Japan and the Soviet Union signed a neutrality pact and Japan increased pressure on the Vichy French and Dutch colonies in Southeast Asia to cooperate in economic matters. Following Japan's refusal to withdraw from the Republic of China (with the exclusion of Manchukuo) and Indochina; the United States, Great Britain, and the Netherlands imposed an embargo (22 July 1941) on gasoline, while shipments of scrap metal, steel, and other materials had virtually ceased. Meanwhile, American economic support to China began to increase.

Hideki Tojo was a politician and general of the Imperial Japanese Army. Politically, he was a fascist, nationalist, and militarist. Tojo served as Prime Minister of the Empire of Japan during most of the Pacific War (his tenure being 17 October 1941 to 22 July 1944). Tojo supported a preventive war against the United States.

Isoroku Yamamoto was the most famous military commander. He was a Fleet Admiral of the Imperial Japanese Navy and the commander-in-chief of the Combined Fleet during World War II. Isoroku's extensive naval career started when he served on the armored cruiser Nisshin during the Russo-Japanese War (1904–1905). He oversaw many naval operations such as the attack on Pearl Harbor, Battle of the Java Sea, Battle of the Coral Sea and the Battle of Midway. He became an exalted naval hero.

Hiroyoshi Nishizawa was arguably the most successful Japanese flying ace of the Imperial Japanese Navy Air Service with an estimated 120 to 150 victories.

Following the Japanese attack on Pearl Harbor and against several other countries on 7–8 December 1941, the United States, United Kingdom, and other Allies declared war. The Second Sino-Japanese War became part of the global conflict of World War II. Japanese forces initially experienced great success against Allied forces in the Pacific and Southeast Asia, capturing Thailand, Hong Kong, Malaya, Singapore, the Dutch East Indies, the Philippines, and many Pacific Islands. They also undertook major offensives in Burma and launched air and naval attacks against Australia. The Allies turned the tide of war at sea in mid-1942, at the Battle of Midway. Japanese land forces continued to advance in the New Guinea and Solomon Islands campaigns but suffered significant defeats or were forced to retreat at the battles of Milne Bay, the Kokoda Track, and Guadalcanal. The Burma campaign turned, as the Japanese forces suffered catastrophic losses at Imphal and Kohima, leading to the greatest defeat in Japanese history up to that point.

From 1943 onwards, hard-fought campaigns at the battles of Buna-Gona, the Tarawa, the Philippine Sea, Leyte Gulf, Iwo Jima, Okinawa, and others resulted in horrific casualties, mostly on the Japanese side, and produced further Japanese retreats. Very few Japanese ended up in POW camps. This may have been due to Japanese soldiers' reluctance to surrender. The Battle of Okinawa was the bloodiest battle of the Pacific War. The total number of casualties shocked American military strategists. This made them apprehensive to invade Japan's main islands, because it would result in a very high death toll. The brutality of the conflict is exemplified by US troops taking body parts from dead Japanese soldiers as "war trophies" or "war souvenirs" and Japanese cannibalism.

During the Pacific War, some units of the Imperial Japanese Army engaged in war crimes. This was in particular the mistreatment of prisoners of war and civilians. Between 1937 and 1945, approximately 7,357,000 civilians died due to military activity in the Republic of China. Mistreatment of Allied prisoners of war through forced labour and brutality received extensive coverage in the west. During that period there were significant underlying cultural differences, because according to Bushido it was cowardly and shameful to surrender to the enemy. Thus soldiers who surrendered had relinquished their honor and did not deserve respect or basic treatment. Fred Borch explained:

As Japan continued its modernization in the early 20th century, her armed forces became convinced that success in battle would be assured if Japanese soldiers, sailors, and airmen had the "spirit" of Bushido. ... The result was that the Bushido code of behavior "was inculcated into the Japanese soldier as part of his basic training." Each soldier was indoctrinated to accept that it was the greatest honor to die for the Emperor and it was cowardly to surrender to the enemy. ... Bushido therefore explains why the Japanese in the NEI so mistreated POWs in their custody. Those who had surrendered to the Japanese—regardless of how courageously or honorably they had fought—merited nothing but contempt; they had forfeited all honor and literally deserved nothing. Consequently, when the Japanese murdered POWs by shooting, beheading, and drowning, these acts were excused since they involved the killing of men who had forfeited all rights to be treated with dignity or respect. While civilian internees were certainly in a different category from POWs, it is reasonable to think that there was a "spill-over" effect from the tenets of Bushido.

— Fred Borch, Military Trials of War Criminals in the Netherlands East Indies 1946–1949

The Japanese government has been criticized for inadequate acknowledgement of the suffering caused during World War II in history teaching in its schools which caused international protest.

On 6 August and 9 August 1945, the U.S. dropped two atomic bombs on Hiroshima and Nagasaki. An estimated 150,000–246,000 people died as a direct result of these two bombings. Japan did not have nuclear weapon technology so this new type of atomic bomb was a surprise. Hiroshima was totally unprepared. 69% of Hiroshima's buildings were destroyed and 6% damaged. At this time, on 8 August, the Soviet Union entered the war against Japan.

Japan surrendered on 15 August 1945, and a formal Instrument of Surrender was signed on 2 September 1945, on the battleship USS Missouri in Tokyo Bay. The surrender was accepted, from a Japanese delegation led by Foreign Minister Mamoru Shigemitsu, by General Douglas MacArthur, as Supreme Allied Commander, along with representatives of each Allied nation. A separate surrender ceremony between Japan and China was held in Nanjing on 9 September 1945.

Throughout history Japan has never been fully invaded nor conquered by a foreign power. Japan also never capitulated to a foreign power, thus Japan was unwilling to surrender. However, Japan couldn't counter the destructive nuclear bombs of America. So the Japanese thought it was better to accept the humiliating Potsdam Declaration and rebuild Japan rather than continue fighting with millions of casualties and decades of guerrilla warfare. On 15 August 1945, the radio broadcast of recorded speech of Emperor Shōwa was released to the public. The last sentence is indicative:

it is according to the dictates of time and fate that We have resolved to pave the way for a grand peace for all the generations to come by enduring the unendurable and suffering what is unsufferable.

Following the surrender, Douglas MacArthur established bases in Japan to oversee the postwar development of the country. This period in Japanese history is known as the Allied Occupation (1945–1952), when for the first time in history of Japan was occupied by a foreign power. U.S. President Harry S. Truman officially proclaimed an end to hostilities on 31 December 1946. As the de facto military ruler of Japan, Douglas MacArthur's influence was so great that he was dubbed the Gaijin Shōgun (外人将軍). The Allies (led by the United States) repatriated millions of ethnic Japanese from colonies and military camps throughout Asia. This largely eliminated the Japanese Empire and restored the independence of its conquered territories.

Imperial Japanese Army and Navy were disbanded by the Supreme Commander for the Allied Powers. Upon adoption of the 1947 constitution, Japan became the State of Japan (Nihon Koku, 日本国). The Empire of Japan was dismantled and all overseas territories were lost. Japan was reduced to the territories that were traditionally within the Japanese cultural sphere pre-1895: the four main islands (Honshu, Hokkaido, Kyushu, and Shikoku), the Ryukyu Islands, and the Nanpō Islands. The Kuril Islands also historically belong to Japan. The Kuril Islands were first inhabited by the Ainu people and then controlled by the Japanese Matsumae clan in the Edo period. However, the Kuril Islands weren't included due to a dispute with the Soviet Union.

Over the course of the war, Japan displayed many significant advances in military technology, strategy, and tactics. Among them were the Yamato-class battleship, aircraft carrier innovation (e.g. Hōshō), the Sen-Toku submarine bomber carriers, Mitsubishi Zero fighters, Kamikaze bombers, type 91 torpedo, Nakajima Kikka, Yokosuka MXY-7 Ohka, Kaiten human torpedoes and the Kairyū-class submarine.

== Contemporary period ==
=== Shōwa era, Occupation (1945–1952) and Post-war (1952–1989) ===
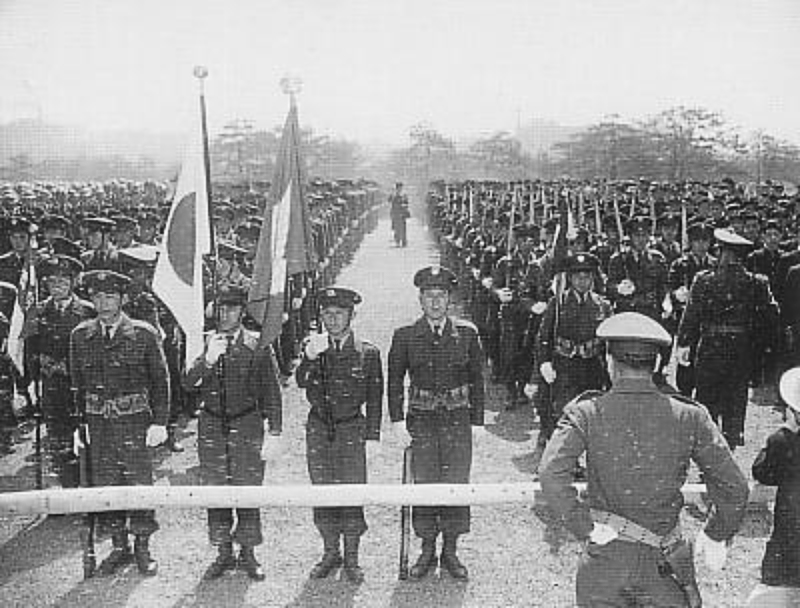
National Police Reserve, 3 May 1952

Article 9 of the Japanese Constitution

(1) Aspiring sincerely to an international peace based on justice and order, the Japanese people forever renounce war as a sovereign right of the nation and the threat or use of force as means of settling international disputes.
(2) In order to accomplish the aim of the preceding paragraph, land, sea, and air forces, as well as other war potential, will never be maintained. The right of belligerency of the state will not be recognized.

Post World War II, Japan was deprived of any military capability after signing the surrender agreement in 1945. The Allied occupation forces were fully responsible for protecting Japan from external threats. Japan only had a minor police force for domestic security. Japan was under the sole control of the U.S. military. This was the only time in Japanese history that it was occupied by a foreign power.

Unlike the occupation of Germany, other countries such as the Soviet Union had almost zero influence in Japan. West Germany was allowed to write its own constitution under supervision of the Allies. West Germany was at the forefront of the Cold War and was not required to include a pacifist clause in their constitution. Meanwhile, General Douglas MacArthur had near complete control over Japanese politics. 1947 Japanese constitution was mostly written by the United States and under the guidelines of General Douglas MacArthur. This changed Japan's previous authoritarian system of quasi-absolute monarchy to a form of liberal democracy with constitutional monarchy and parliamentary-based political system. The constitution guarantees civil and human rights. The Emperor changed to a symbolic status as "the symbol of the State and of the unity of the people." Douglas MacArthur included Article 9 which says Japan forever renounces war as an instrument for settling international disputes and declares that Japan will never again maintain "land, sea, or air forces or other war potential". Japan became a pacifist country since September 1945. The trauma of World War II produced strong pacifist sentiments among the nation.

There were growing external threats of the Cold War and Japan did not have adequate forces to counter it. During the Korean War (1950–1953) Japan was the forward logistics base and provided many supplies for US and UN forces. The unilateral renunciation of all military capabilities was questioned by conservative politicians. These sentiments were intensified in 1950 as occupation troops were moved from Japan to the Korean War (1950–53). This left Japan virtually defenseless and vulnerable. They thought a mutual defense relationship with the United States was needed to protect Japan from foreign threats. In July 1950 the Japanese government, with the encouragement of the US occupation forces, established a National Police Reserve (警察予備隊 Keisatsu-yobitai). This consisted of 75,000 men equipped with light infantry weapons. This was the first step of its postwar rearmament. In 1952, Coastal Safety Force (海上警備隊, Kaijō Keibitai), the waterborne counterpart of NPR, was also founded.

The Allied occupation of Japan ended after the signing of the Treaty of San Francisco on 8 September 1951, which became effective on 28 April 1952, thus restoring the sovereignty of Japan.

On 8 September 1951, the Security Treaty Between the United States and Japan was signed. The treaty allowed United States forces stationed in Japan to deal with external aggression against Japan while Japanese ground and maritime forces dealt with internal threats and natural disasters. The United States was permitted to act for the sake of maintaining peace in East Asia and could exert its power on Japanese domestic quarrels. The treaty has lasted longer than any other alliance between two great powers since the Peace of Westphalia treaties in 1648. Accordingly, in mid-1952, the National Police Reserve was expanded to 110,000 men and renamed the National Safety Forces. The Coastal Safety Force was an embryonic navy that was transferred with the National Police Reserve to the National Safety Agency.

Strict civilian control over the military was established with the 1947-constitution to prevent the military from regaining overwhelming political power. Thus soldiers, sailors and airforce members cannot be involved in political activities. The Defense Agency of Japan stated that:

"Painfully aware of the regrettable state of affairs that had prevailed in this country until the end of World War II, Japan has adopted systems of uncompromising civilian control that are entirely different from those that existed under the former Constitution, so that the JSDF should be established and operated in accordance with the will of the people."

— Defense Agency (of Japan)

The war-renunciation clause of Article 9 was the basis for strong political objections to any sort of armed force other than a conventional police force. In 1954, however, separate land, sea, and air forces were created for defensive purposes, under the command of the Prime Minister. The 1954 Self-Defense Forces Act (Act No. 165 of 1954) reorganized the National Security Board as the Defense Agency on 1 July 1954. Afterward, the National Security Force was reorganized as the Japan Ground Self-Defense Force (GSDF) (陸上自衛隊 Rikujō Jieitai), which is the de facto post-war Japanese army. The Coastal Safety Force was reorganized as the Japan Maritime Self-Defense Force (JMSDF) (海上自衛隊 Kaijō Jieitai), which is the de facto Japanese Navy. The Japan Air Self-Defense Force (JASDF) (航空自衛隊 Kōkū Jieitai) was established as a new branch of the JSDF. General Keizō Hayashi was appointed as the first Chairman of Joint Staff Council—professional head of the three branches. Conscription was abolished on 3 May 1947. Enlistment in the JSDF is voluntary at 18 years of age and older.

The Far East Air Force, U.S. Air Force, announced on 6 January 1955, that 85 aircraft would be turned over to the fledgling Japanese air force on about 15 January, the first equipment of the new force.

On 19 January 1960, the unequal status of Japan with the United States was corrected with the amended Treaty of Mutual Cooperation and Security between the United States and Japan by adding mutual defense obligations. This treaty requires the US to pre-inform Japan of US army mobilization and to not impose itself concerning Japanese domestic issues. Japan and the United States are obligated to assist each other if there's an armed attack in territories administered by Japan. Japan and the United States are required to maintain capacities to resist common armed attacks. This established a military alliance between Japan and the United States.

Japan is the only country to have suffered nuclear attacks in history. Thus in 1967, Prime Minister Eisaku Satō outlined the Three Non-Nuclear Principles by which Japan stands against the production or possession of nuclear weaponry. However, due to its high technology level and large number of operating nuclear power plants, Japan is considered to be "nuclear capable", i.e., it could develop usable nuclear weapons within one year if the political situation changed significantly. Thus many analysts consider Japan a de facto nuclear state. Numerous politicians such as Shinzo Abe and Yasuo Fukuda explained that Japan's constitution doesn't ban possession of nuclear weapons. They should be kept at a minimum and used as tactical weapons. The 1951 US-Japan Security Treaty puts Japan under the US nuclear umbrella.

The last Japanese soldiers of World War II to surrender were Hiroo Onoda and Teruo Nakamura in 1974. Onoda was an intelligence officer and second lieutenant in the Imperial Japanese Army. He continued his campaign after WWII for 29 years in a Japanese holdout on Lubang Island, the Philippines. He returned to Japan when he was relieved from duty by his commanding officer, Major Yoshimi Taniguchi as per the order of Emperor Shōwa in 1974. Teruo Nakamura was an Amis aborigine from Japanese Taiwan in the Takasago Volunteer Unit of the Imperial Japanese army. He was stationed on Morotai Island, Indonesia and discovered by a pilot in mid-1974. Nakamura was repatriated to Taiwan in 1975.

Throughout the post-war Shōwa period, the Japanese had a low opinion of the JSDF. They were seen as remnants of the imperial military who caused a severe loss and humiliating surrender of World War II. They were considered "tax thieves" (zeikin dorobo) for being expensive and unnecessary while Japan had decades of booming economy. So the JSDF was still trying to find its place in Japanese society and earn respect and trust from the public. The SDF was managed by the Japan Defense Agency which had little political influence compared to ministries. The JSDF had good personnel and equipment, but mainly served a supplementary role for the US military against the Soviet Union.

Japan had record high economic growth during the Japanese economic miracle. By the 1970s Japan ascended to great power status again. It had the world's second largest economy. However, its military power was very limited due to pacifist policies and article 9 of the 1947 constitution. Japan exerted disproportionately small political and military influence in the world. This made Japan an abnormal great power.

=== Heisei era (1989–2019) ===
==== Departure from pacifism ====
During the Gulf War (1990–1991) the Japan Self-Defense Forces couldn't participate due to restrictions of the 1947 constitution. However, Japan did make a financial contribution of $10 billion and sent military hardware. Japan's inability to send troops was regarded as a big humiliation. They learned that only making financial contributions (checkbook diplomacy) did not earn Japan international respect. Furthermore, Japan couldn't provide much support to US forces which caused frustration. This humiliation was decisive in making policymakers and military planners determined to depart from Japan's pacifist foreign policy.

Since 1991, the JSDF has conducted international activities to provide support for peacekeeping missions and disaster relief efforts as well as to help prevent conflict and terrorism. Particularly humanitarian aid such as helping the victims of the 1995 Kobe earthquake and humanitarian, reconstruction assistance in Iraq (2003 till 2009). In 1992 a law was passed to permit the JSDF to participate in UN Peacekeeping missions.

The Guidelines for Japan-U.S. Defense Cooperation were revised in 1997 which increased the scope for the JSDF as rear-support for US forces by providing logistics support near Japan.

On 28 May 1999, the Regional Affairs Law was enacted. It allows Japan to automatically participate as "rear support" if the United States begins a war under "regional affairs".

==== 21st Century ====
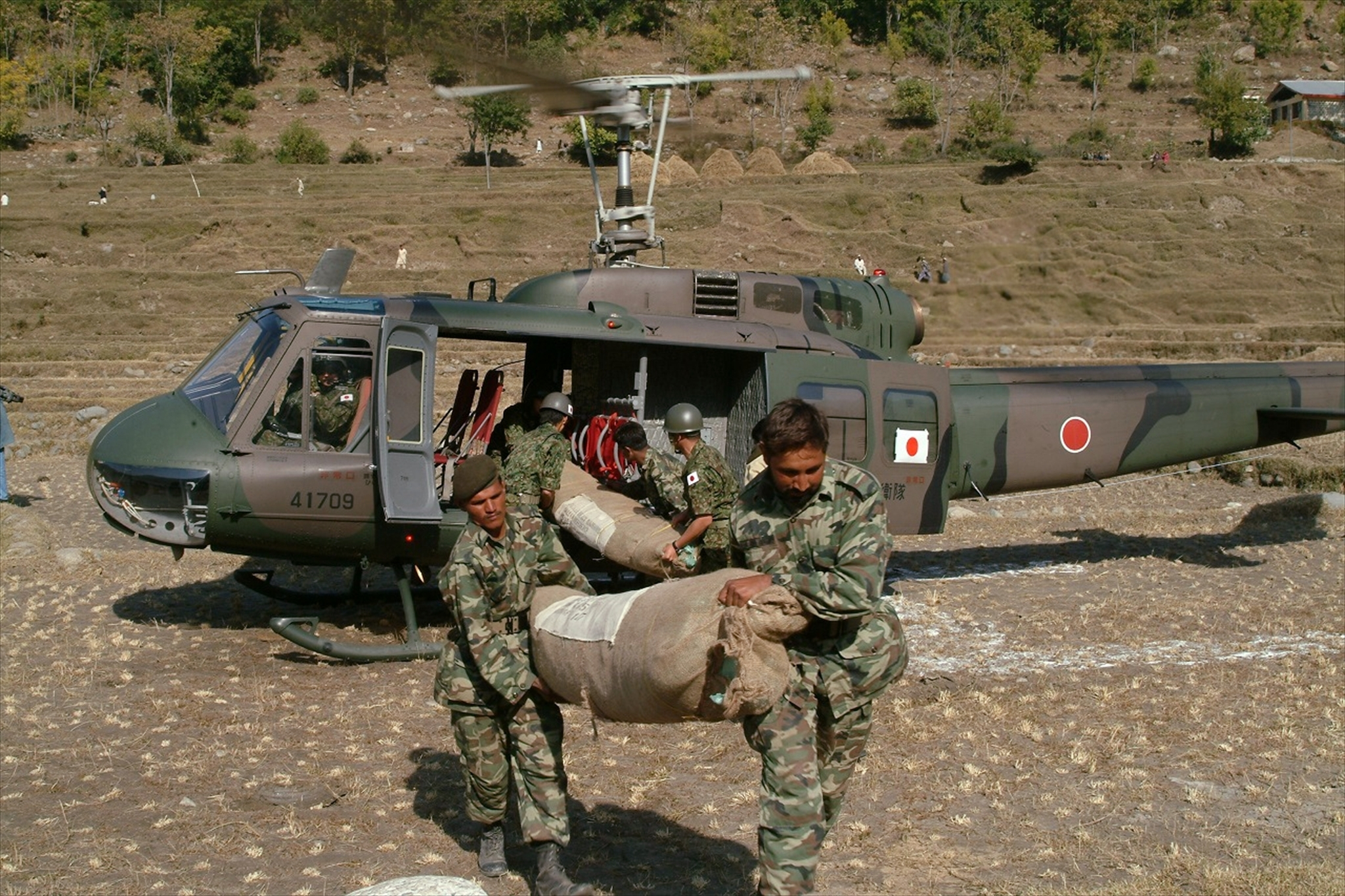
A JGSDF Bell-Fuji UH-1H conducting Kashmir earthquake relief activities (2005)

The modern Japan Self-Defense Forces is one of the most technologically advanced armed forces in the world. The JSDF ranked as the world's fourth most-powerful military in conventional capabilities in a Credit Suisse report in 2015. It has the eighth-largest military budget in the world with just 1% of GDP (2011).

Since 1991 the JSDF has participated in dozens of international peacekeeping operations including UN peacekeeping and disaster relief. From 1991 to 2016 the JSDF had approximately 32 overseas dispatches. These were mainly in Southeast Asia, South Asia and the Middle East.

Japan has been a member of the United Nations since 18 December 1956 and served as a non-permanent Security Council member for a total of 20 years. Japan is one of the G4 nations seeking to gain permanent membership of the Security Council. In 2004, the former United Nations Secretary General Kofi Annan announced a plan to expand the number of permanent seats on the United Nations Security Council. Despite being the third largest national economy in the world in terms of nominal GDP, with global political influence, some debate whether or not a country with no official standing military can be considered a world power that should have a permanent seat on the council.

The Anti-Terrorism Special Measures Law was passed on October 29, 2001. It allows the JSDF to contribute by itself to international efforts to the prevention and eradication of terrorism. While on duty the JSDF can use weapons to protect themselves and others who come under their control. Previously Japan's policy was non-involvement.

On 22 December 2001, the Battle of Amami-Ōshima was a six hour long confrontation with an undercover North Korean spy and infiltration ship. The spy ship was heavily armed and 400 km north west of the Japanese island Amami Ōshima. The spy ship did not heed warnings of the Japanese Coast Guard and tried to escape. 12 patrol boats and 13 planes of the JCG and 2 MSDF destroyers chased the ship. Eventually the spy vessel opened fire and, after receiving fire from JCG cutters, sunk with self-destructive explosion. All 15 crew members died. This was the first time since World War 2 that Japan attacked and sank a foreign ship in Japan's sea territory.

On 27 March 2004, the Japan Defense Agency activated the Special Operations Group with the mandate under the JGSDF as its Counter-terrorist unit.

On 8 June 2006, the Cabinet of Japan (premiership of Junichiro Koizumi) endorsed a bill elevating the Defense Agency (防衛庁, Bōeichō) under the Cabinet Office to full-fledged cabinet-level Ministry of Defense (防衛省, Bōeishō). This was passed by the National Diet in December 2006, and has been enforced since 9 January 2007.

In 2007, Prime Minister Shinzō Abe said that Japan's constitution did not necessarily ban possession of nuclear weapons, so long as they were kept at a minimum and were tactical weapons, and Chief Cabinet Secretary Yasuo Fukuda expressed a similar view.

On 9 January 2007, Section 2 of Article 3 of the Self Defense Forces Act was revised. JSDF activities abroad were elevated from "miscellaneous regulations" to "basic duties". This fundamentally changed the nature of the JSDF because its activities are no longer solely defensive. JMSDF ships can be dispatched worldwide such as in activities against pirates. The JSDF's first postwar overseas base was established in Djibouti, Somalia (July 2010).

==== Resurgence ====
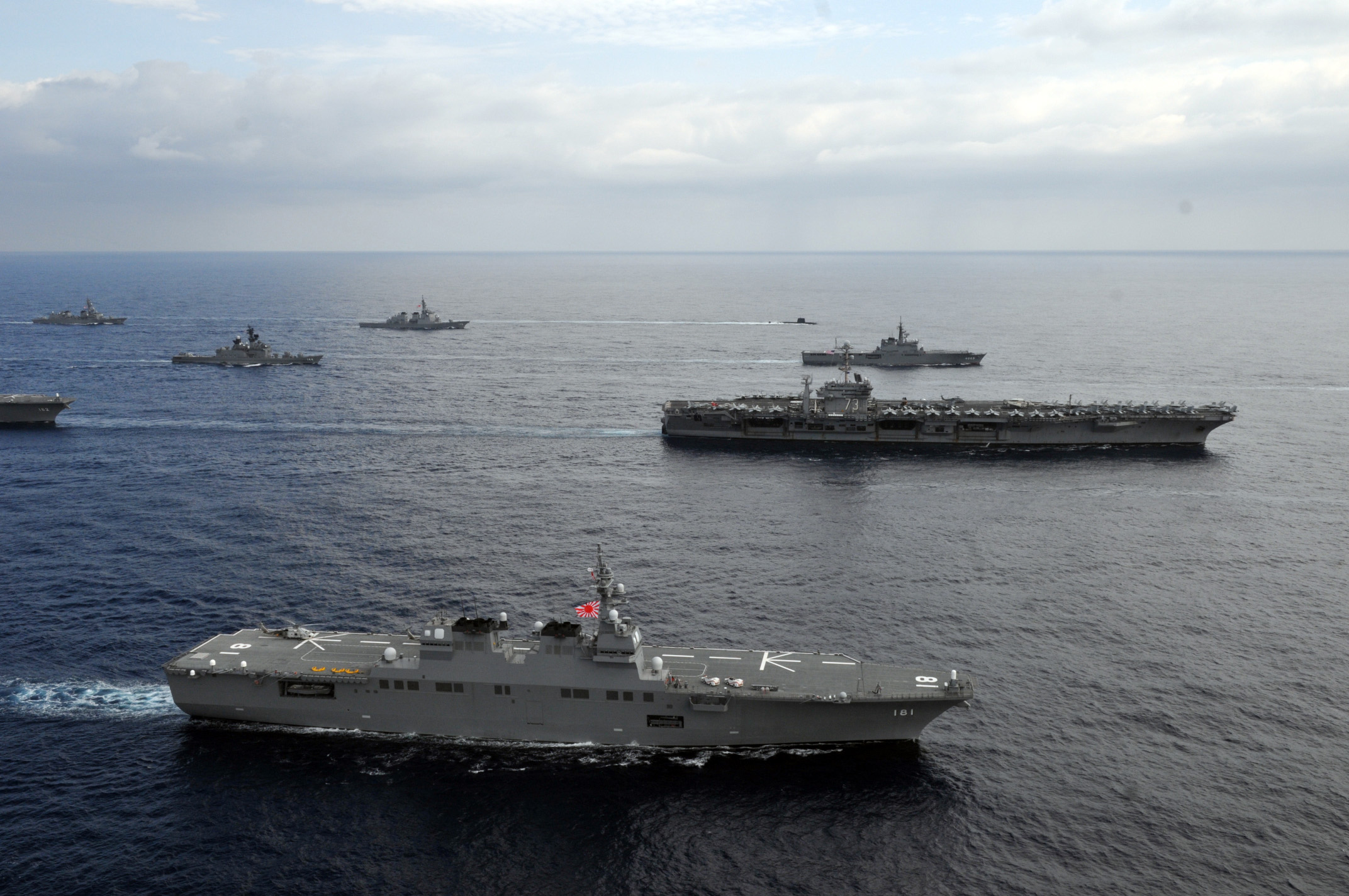
USS George Washington and JS Hyūga after the exercise Keen Sword 2013

Since 2010, Japan reemerged as a major military power. Various policies increased the role of Japan's military in its foreign policy. Japan's 2010 National Defense Program Guidelines changed its defense policy from a focus on the former Soviet Union to China.

After a decade of defense spending cuts, Japan increased its defense budget in 2013. The Cabinet of Japan approved the National Security Strategy (NSS) in December 2013. This explains what instigated Japan's military resurgence: China is using military force in the skies and seas to unilaterally change the status quo in the South China Sea and East China Sea. This is based on China's assertions that are incompatible with the established order. China also lacks transparency of its military and national security policies.

The Japanese are concerned about a gradual decline in commitment by the United States to support Japan in a multi-polarizing world. Thus since 2010 Japan has moved to a more autonomous security policy while maintaining the U.S.-Japan alliance. Japan has increased its power projection capabilities such as with the development of homemade long-range cruise missiles, the Amphibious Rapid Deployment Brigade and the modification of two Izumo-class destroyers into de facto aircraft carriers with F-35Bs. There's gradual integration among the three JSDF branches so they can operate more autonomously from the US.

The United States maintains American military bases in Japan as part of the U.S.-Japan alliance of 1951. Most US military are in Okinawa Prefecture. In 2013 there were approximately 50,000 U.S. military personnel stationed in Japan with 40,000 dependents and 5,500 American civilians employed by the United States Department of Defense. The United States Seventh Fleet is based in Yokosuka, Kanagawa Prefecture. The 3rd Marine Expeditionary Force (III MEF) is based in Okinawa. 130 USAF fighters are stationed in the Misawa Air Base and Kadena Air Base. U.S. Fleet Activities Yokosuka is the largest and strategically most important U.S. naval base in the western Pacific. The base was previously the headquarters of the Yokosuka Naval District of the Imperial Japanese Navy, but now only a small portion of it is used by the JMSDF. Kadena Air Base is the largest and most active US Air Force base in the Far East. Japan pays 75% ($4.4 billion) of all US basing costs. Japan's willingness to host the majority of the US Armed Forces in Asia makes Japan essential to America's security policy in the Indo-Pacific. This helps the U.S. to project military force in the Pacific and Asia. The U.S.-Japan alliance is the cornerstone of peace, stability and economic prosperity in the Pacific.

On 4 December 2013, the National Security Council was established to coordinate the national security policies of Japan.

In June 2014, Prime Minister Shinzo Abe and his cabinet agreed to lift the long-term ban on Japanese troops engaging in combat abroad. This was in a bid to strengthen the Japanese situation amid an ever-growing Chinese military aggression and North Korea's nuclear weapons programme.

The JSDF Act was amended in 2015 in order to make it illegal for JSDF personnel/staff to participate in collective insubordination or to command forces without authority or in violation of orders, which was stated to be the reason why Japan invaded China in World War II.

==== Global U.S.-Japan alliance ====
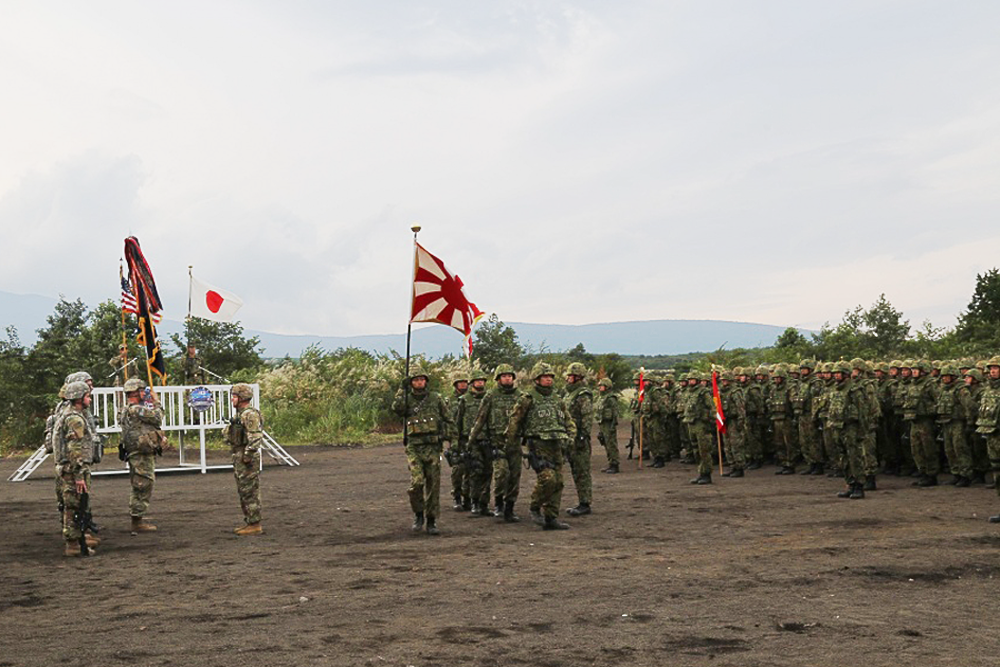
JGSDF and U.S. soldiers participate in the Orient Shield 2017 opening ceremony at Camp Shin Yokotsuka, 11 September 2017

Until 2015, the U.S.-Japan alliance was a regional alliance with an exclusively defense oriented policy on defending Japan. The Guidelines for Japan-U.S. Defense Cooperation (2015) changed it into a global alliance with global military cooperation and greater U.S.-Japan coordination. It removed the regional restrictions that the alliance was only for Japan and the surrounding area. This allowed Japan to assume a global military role such as in the Indo-Pacific. It was the first defense cooperation guidelines revision since 1997. Former U.S. Secretary of State John Kerry reaffirmed that America has an ironclad commitment to Japan's security which covers all territories under Japan's administration. Constitutional reinterpretations of Article 9 and military legislation have expanded the role of the JSDF such as collective self-defense with allies.

On 18 September 2015, the National Diet enacted the 2015 Japanese military legislation, a series of laws that allow Japan's Self-Defense Forces to collective self-defense of allies in combat for the first time under its constitution. The Self-Defense Forces may provide material support to allies engaged in combat internationally. It also allows JSDF troops to defend weapons platforms of foreign countries that contribute to Japan's defense. The justification is that by not defending/supporting an ally, it would weaken alliances and endanger Japan. These were Japan's broadest changes to its defense laws since World War II.

Since March 2016, Japan's Legislation for Peace and Security enables seamless responses of the JSDF to any situation to protect the lives and livelihood of Japanese people. It also increases proactive contributions to peace and security in the world and deepens cooperation with partners. This enhanced the Japan-US alliance as global partners to promote peace and security in the region and the international community.

As of 2012, Japan and its allies want to maintain a "Free and Open Indo-Pacific" (FOIP). This means any country can freely navigate across the Indian Ocean and Pacific Ocean from Asia to Africa for economic purposes. By implementing and guarding the rule of law in the oceans, peace, stability and prosperity can be promoted. The FOIP strategy became the official policy of Japan and the United States in 2017. This is the opposite to China's Belt and Road Initiative where China seeks to become the main economic partner with major or dominant influence in countries in Eurasia, the Middle-East and Africa. There are territorial disputes in the South China Sea, because China claims nearly the whole South China Sea and wants to control the vital sea lanes in Asia. China built military outposts on islands which intimidate and violate the territorial claims of other countries like Taiwan, Vietnam, Malaysia, Indonesia, Brunei and the Philippines. One third of global seaborne trade ($3 trillion) passed through the South China Sea in 2017.

A January 2018 survey by the Cabinet Office found 89.8% have a good impression of the JSDF.

Japan activated the Amphibious Rapid Deployment Brigade, its first marine unit since World War Two, on 7 April 2018. They're trained to counter invaders from occupying Japanese islands. Japan did not have an amphibious force since the Imperial Japanese Navy Land Forces. 50 ARDB soldiers were deployed with 4 armored vehicles for the first time in an overseas training exercise with American and Filipino marines in Operation Kamandag in Luzon, the Philippines from 2 to 11 October 2018. This was the first time that Japanese armored vehicles landed on foreign soil since World War II.

The Ministry of Defense said from 1 October 2018, the maximum age for enlisted personnel and non-commissioned officer applicants will be raised to 32 from 26 to secure "a stable supply of Self-Defense Forces (military) personnel amid a declining pool of recruits due to the recently declining birth rate."

The Ministry of Defense is developing supersonic glide bombs to strengthen the defense of Japan's remote islands, including the Senkaku Islands. The anti-surface strike capability will be used to help the Amphibious Rapid Deployment Brigade's landing and recapture operations of remote islands.

Military cooperation increased significantly with other like-minded democratic countries such as India, Australia, the United States and the United Kingdom. Such as on 2 October 2018, British troops of the Honourable Artillery Company (HAC) exercised together for the first time with Japanese GSDF soldiers in Oyama, Shizuoka prefecture. This also marked the first time in history that foreign soldiers other than Americans exercised on Japanese soil. The purpose was to improve their strategic partnership and security cooperation. Lieutenant General Patrick Sanders said that Japan won't have to fight alone.

The Ministry of Defense allocated $57 million for research and development of a hypersonic missile in the 2019 Defense Budget. It could travel five times the speed of sound (Mach 5) or faster. A scramjet engine prototype, jet fuel technology and heat-resistant materials will be built with testing from 2023 to 2025.

Japan christened the 84-meter long, 2,950 tons Oryu submarine on 4 October 2018. It is Japan's first submarine powered by lithium-ion batteries and was developed by Mitsubishi Heavy Industries. The Japan Maritime Self-Defense Force will utilize it by March 2020.

The JGSDF and the Indian Army conducted their first joint military exercise in the Indian state of Mizoram from 27 October to 18 November 2018. It's primarily anti-terror drills and improving bilateral cooperation with 60 Japanese and Indian officers.

Japan and the United States conducted the biggest military exercise around Japan thus far in the biennial Keen Sword from 29 October to 2 November 2018. It included a total of 57,000 sailors, marines and airmen. 47,000 service members were from the JSDF and 10,000 from the U.S. Armed Forces. A naval supply ship and frigate of the Royal Canadian Navy also participated. There were simulations of air combat, ballistic missile defense and amphibious landings.

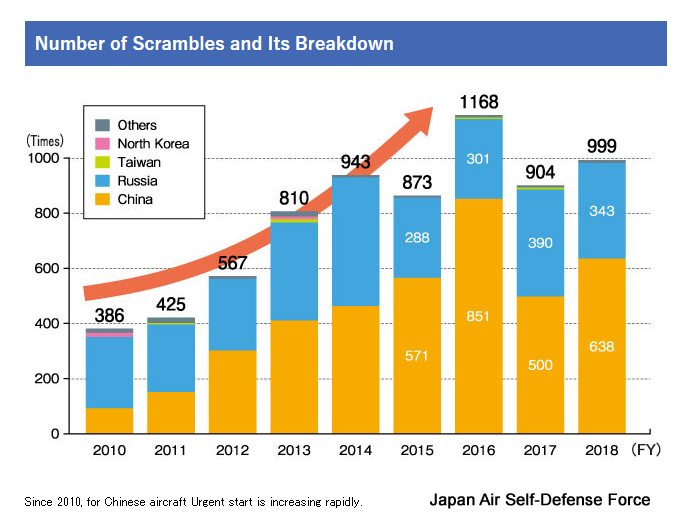
Number of scrambles and its breakdown of the JASDF (2010–2018)

Since 2008, the number of scrambles by the JASDF to intercept Chinese aircraft has increased rapidly. In 2010 there were scrambles against 31 Chinese aircraft and 193 Russian aircraft. In 2018 this increased to 638 Chinese aircraft and 343 Russian aircraft. Chinese aircraft flight paths are mostly in the East China Sea, around the Ryukyu Islands and through the Korea Strait. Russia frequently conducts flights orbiting Japan.

The Ministry of Defense reported in fiscal 2018 that there were 999 scrambles by JASDF jets against mainly Chinese and Russian unidentified aircraft. That is the second highest amount of scrambles by the JASDF since 1958. 638 (64%) were Chinese aircraft and 343 (34%) were Russian aircraft. On 20 June 2019, two Russian bombers (Tupolev Tu-95) violated Japanese airspace twice on the same day.

In December 2018, the Ministry of Defense announced they would procure an additional 63 F-35As and 42 F-35Bs. This increases the total F-35 Lightning II procurement from 42 to 147.

The Japanese government approved the first ever JSDF dispatch to a peacekeeping operation that's not led by the United Nations. Two JGSDF officers will monitor a cease-fire between Israel and Egypt at the Multinational Force and Observers command in the Sinai peninsula from 19 April till 30 November 2019.

On 19 April 2019, Japan and the United States confirmed that cyberattacks are also covered by the bilateral security treaty. This will be judged on a case-by-case basis. Defense cooperation will increase for outer space, cyber and electronic warfare.

Defense Minister Takeshi Iwaya announced plans to deploy Type 12 surface-to-ship missiles in March 2020. They have an increased range of 300 km and will be used to protect the southern Ryukyu Islands. Japan is also developing high-speed gliding missiles with a range of 1000 km.

=== Reiwa era (2019–present) ===
People's Liberation Army Navy vessels (PLAN) increasingly make incursions in the Western Pacific Ocean via the Miyako Strait. The Miyako Strait is one of the few international waterways through which China can access the Pacific Ocean. There is also increased Chinese naval and aerial activity near the Senkaku islands which are owned by Japan, but claimed by China. This puts the Southern Ryukyu Islands at the forefront of Japan's national defense. By 2030 China could have four aircraft carriers. Meanwhile, Japan only has two relatively small Izumo-class carriers. Each Izumo can carry just 10 F-35s. There are currently no plans to build bigger multi-purpose operation destroyers though experts say Japan needs at least four carriers for effective use in real combat situations.

China's military spending has increased greatly since 1999. In 2019 China was the second highest military spender with $250 billion (1.9% of GDP). This has strengthened its military power in the seas and skies around Japan. Comparatively, Japan's expenditure was $46.6 billion (0.9% of GDP). Japan still depends on America for deterrence and offensive attack capabilities due to Article 9 of the 1947 constitution.

In May 2019, the JMSDF participated for the first time in two quadrilateral naval exercises. It included the JS Izumo and JS Murasame. It was also the first extended naval deployment of marines of the Amphibious Rapid Deployment Brigade. The first exercise was a four-way sail-through in the South China Sea with naval ships of the United States, India, Japan and the Philippines. The second was the La Pérouse exercise in the Bay of Bengal with France, United States, Australia and Japan.

On 28 May 2019, President of the United States Donald Trump inspected the JS Kaga, the second ship in the Izumo class, during his visit in Japan and supported the country's effort for an active role in the defense and security of the Pacific region. This was the first ever inspection by a U.S. president of a Japanese warship. Trump also stated that the JS Kaga will help defend Japan and America against threats in the region and far beyond.

There is increasing support among Japanese to change Japan from being a pacifist to a "normal" country with an official military. In April 2019, a Kyodo News poll showed 45% thought Article 9 of the constitution should be revised. This support for revision is partially due to: the hostility of North Korea, an increasingly assertive China, and unstable relations with Russia due to territorial disputes that prevent a peace treaty being signed. There are territorial disputes involving the Senkaku Islands, Liancourt Rocks, and the Kuril Islands. Japanese claim that the U.S. has failed to properly address these issues, so Japan must grant itself the means to adequately protect itself.

Attempts have been made by multiple Governments of Japan to amend the Japanese Constitution so that Japan can have an official and normal military with offensive capabilities to share an equal burden of national security duties. This was prevented by an anti-war sentiment among the populace and politicians. In May 2017, Japanese Prime Minister Shinzo Abe set a 2020 deadline for revising the Article 9 of the Japanese Constitution, a clause in the national Constitution of Japan outlawing war as a means to settle international disputes involving the state. This charter was written by the United States.

The 'Defense of Japan 2019' white paper lists China as a bigger threat than North Korea. Defense Minister Taro Kono said "The reality is that China is rapidly increasing military spending," "China is deploying air and sea assets in the Western Pacific and through the Tsushima Strait into the Sea of Japan with greater frequency." The paper downgraded South Korea for exiting a military intelligence-sharing pact. This could make it more difficult to manage threats from North Korea.

On 21 October 2019, a senior U.S. military officer in Tokyo said that "Japan's avoidance of offensive weaponry under its constitution is no longer acceptable." The officer stated that Japan needs to rethink its rejection of offensive weapons and that the government should discuss it with the public. The officer also mentioned restrictions that limit the US forces and the JSDF's preparation for contingencies. The officer said that the government of Japan should inform the public about the threats of China and North Korea. In particular China's military buildup with ballistic missiles and its antagonistic behavior threatens Japan and other countries.

On 10 September 2020, Japan and India signed a military pact called the Acquisition and Cross-Servicing Agreement (ACSA). The pact allows them to exchange logistical support and supplies. This includes transportation and cross-use of facilities during joint exercises and U.N. peacekeeping operations and to share food, fuel, spare parts. Narendra Modi and Shinzo Abe believe it will boost a Free and Open Indo-Pacific region and to deter Chinese aggression in Asia. Japan already had such agreements with Australia, Canada, France, UK and USA.

Australia and Japan agreed in-principle to sign a Reciprocal Access Agreement (RAA) on 17, November 2020. This will enhance and streamline strategic and defense co-operation. Prime Minister Morrison said it is a "pivotal moment in the history of Japan-Australia ties".

In 2021, the NHK reported that the Chinese military used a hacker group called Tick for cyberattacks on nearly 200 Japanese research institutions and firms. A member of China's Communist Party used a false name to rent servers in Japan from which the cyberattacks were conducted.

As of 2021, the Japanese government has discovered that foreign groups funded with Chinese capital are involved in at least 700 land sales within 10 km (6.2 mi) of U.S. military bases—and Japanese Self-Defense Force, Coast Guard, and space development facilities—in Japan. In Kanagawa Prefecture, a Chinese government–linked land buyer acquired multiple high-rise buildings and other locations overlooking the bases. Similar instances were found in Okinawa Prefecture and Tottori Prefecture. In 2017, the Sankei Shimbun reported that Chinese capital had purchased land in Hokkaido equivalent to the acreage of 513 Tokyo Domes. The Japanese Diet intends to pass a foreign land use control bill.

== Japan's militaristic heritage ==
A social hierarchy chart based on old academic theories. Such hierarchical diagrams were removed from Japanese textbooks after various studies in the 1990s revealed that peasants, craftsmen, and merchants were in fact equal and merely social categories. Successive shōguns held the highest or near-highest court ranks, higher than most court nobles.

What distinguishes Japan from other countries is that Japan was near continuously ruled by the military class with the shōgun, daimyō and samurai in the top of the Japanese social structure for 676 years (from 1192 till 1868). In 1192, the shōgun Minamoto no Yoritomo and the Minamoto clan established a feudal military government in Kamakura. The Emperor was above the shōgun and revered as the sovereign, but merely a figurehead. The Imperial Court nobility was a nominal ruling court with little influence. The actual ruling class were Japanese military figures: the shōgun (military dictator), daimyō (feudal lords) and the samurai (military nobility and officers). The samurai were idolized and their conduct was role model behavior for other social classes. This resulted in Japanese culture to have a long militaristic heritage. In human history only a few countries had a warrior caste at the top of their social structure, a class that was practically above the aristocracy. Few military governments lasted more than 600 years.

One key difference between ancient China and Japanese society was the development of the samurai class in Japan. Feudal China had four classes: Confucian literati and landlords, peasants, artisans and merchants. The Confucian literati and landlords were at the top of Chinese social structure. Japanese feudal society was also stratified, but had the samurai class in the top of Japanese society since the 12th century. Thus many experts consider pre-modern Japan a "warrior nation" as the ideals, ideologies of the samurai permeated through Japanese culture and society. Such as bushido and the Japanese proverb Hana wa sakuragi, hito wa bushi (Japanese: 花は桜木人は武士, literally "the [best] blossom is the cherry blossom; the [best] man is the warrior"). Comparatively the Chinese idiom is Haonan budang Bing, Hao tie bu dading (Chinese: 好铁不打钉、好男不当兵, means "Good iron is not cast into nails; good men are not made into soldiers").

In 1551, during the Sengoku period, the Navarrese Roman Catholic missionary Francis Xavier was one of the first westerners who visited Japan. Francis described Japan as follows:

Japan is a very large empire entirely composed of islands. One language is spoken throughout, not very difficult to learn. This country was discovered by the Portuguese eight or nine years ago. The Japanese are very ambitious of honors and distinctions, and think themselves superior to all nations in military glory and valor. They prize and honor all that has to do with war, and all such things, and there is nothing of which they are so proud as of weapons adorned with gold and silver. They always wear swords and daggers both in and out of the house, and when they go to sleep they hang them at the bed's head. In short, they value arms more than any people I have ever seen. They are excellent archers, and usually fight on foot, though there is no lack of horses in the country. They are very polite to each other, but not to foreigners, whom they utterly despise. They spend their means on arms, bodily adornment, and on a number of attendants, and do not in the least care to save money. They are, in short, a very warlike people, and engaged in continual wars among themselves; the most powerful in arms bearing the most extensive sway. They have all one sovereign, although for one hundred and fifty years past the princes have ceased to obey him, and this is the cause of their perpetual feuds.

Nakamura explained in 1843:

Our nation is a nation of arms. The land to the west [China] is a nation of letters. Nations of letters value the pen. Nations of arms value the sword. That's the way it has been from the beginning... Our country and theirs are separated from one another by hundreds of miles, our customs are completely different, the temperaments of our people are dissimilar – so how could we possibly share the same Way? (Nakamura 1843 cited in Watanabe 2012: 285).

The Meiji Restoration consolidated the political system under the Emperor of Japan with practical abilities. The shōgun and daimyō were abolished. Their domains were returned to the emperor. Power was mainly transferred to a group of people called the Meiji oligarchy and the Genrō who helped restore imperial power. The Genrō were retired senior statesmen and informal advisers to the emperor. All Genrō except Saionji Kinmochi were descendants of medium or lower ranking samurai families from Satsuma and Chōshū. They were instrumental in overthrowing the Tokugawa shōgunate in the Boshin War (1868–1869).

In 1873, Emperor Meiji abolished the samurai class in favor of a western-style conscripted army. They lost their privileges such as the only class allowed to wield weapons. Many samurai volunteered as soldiers, and many advanced to be trained as officers. Much of the Imperial Japanese Army officer class was of samurai origin, and were highly motivated, disciplined, and exceptionally trained. Many samurai were literate and well-educated. Such as Baron Sadao Araki who served as the Minister of Education and Iwasaki Yatarō who founded Mitsubishi in 1870. So most leaders in Japanese society during the Meiji period (military, politics and business) were ex-samurai or descendants of samurai. They shared a set of values and outlooks. This caused Japanese militarism to dominate the political and social life of the Empire of Japan. The military class has arguably been the de facto rulers of Japan for about 753 years from 1192 until 1945, starting with the first shōgun until the last ex-samurai politicians. The 1947 constitution transformed Japan into a pacifist country. The former soldiers gained other professions such as salaryman. Douglas MacArthur was dubbed the Gaijin Shōgun (外人将軍) for being the military governor of Japan from 1945 to 1951.

In modern Japan, the warrior heritage is remembered and revered. For example, famous samurai and soldiers in literature (e.g. Miyamoto Musashi, Hiroo Onoda), festivals (Shingen-ko Festival), martial arts, movies, entertainment, art and feudal castles. Cultural practices like the Japanese tea ceremony, monochrome ink painting, Japanese rock gardens and poetry such as the death poem are associated with the samurai and were adopted by warrior patrons throughout the centuries (1200–1600). There are influential Japanese people in business and politics who are descendants of samurai families. The ideals of the samurai and bushido are integral parts of Japanese culture. The ideologies that originated from Japan's military class are adapted and utilized when necessary.

== Japanese military museums ==
These are significant museums about Japanese military history.

- Self-Defense Force
  - JMSDF Kure Museum – About the JMSDF and includes the retired JMSDF Yūshio-class submarine Akishio (SS-579).
  - JGSDF Public Information Center – Asaka, Saitama. It has a museum with real combat equipment and vehicles of the JGSDF.
  - Hamamatsu Air Base – It has a museum about the JASDF with Japanese aviation, planes, technology, tokusatsu and military history.
  - Kanoya Air Base Museum
  - The Naval History Museum - Etajima, Hiroshima
- Modern
  - Yūshūkan – this is the first and oldest war and military museum in Japan, established in 1882.
  - Yamato Museum – it has a 1/10 scale model of the battleship Yamato, a Mitsubishi A6M Zero model 62 and Kaiten human torpedo and a Kairyū-class submarine.
  - Chiran Peace Museum for Kamikaze Pilots – a peace museum dedicated to the hundreds of Kamikaze pilots from the airbase at Chiran.
  - Hiroshima Peace Memorial Museum – dedicated to documenting the atomic bombing of Hiroshima in World War II.
- Feudal Japan
  - Matsumoto Castle – the second floor features a collection of feudal guns, armor, and other weapons.
  - Ninja Museum of Igaryu – about the history of the ninja and ninjutsu.
  - Japanese Sword Museum – dedicated to the art of Japanese swordmaking.

== See also ==
- Japan Self-Defense Forces
  - Military ranks and insignia of the Japan Self-Defense Forces
  - JSDF Overseas Dispatches
  - Military budget of Japan
- Ministry of Defense (Japan)
- Imperial Japanese Armed Forces
  - Imperial Japanese Army
    - Imperial Japanese Army Air Service
    - Kempeitai
  - Imperial Japanese Navy
    - Imperial Japanese Navy Air Service
    - Special Naval Landing Forces
    - Tokubetsu Keisatsutai
- Japan and weapons of mass destruction

Related

- History of Japan
- History of Japanese foreign relations
- List of wars involving Japan
- List of Japanese battles
  - Pacific War (Greater East Asia War)
- Japanese militarism
- Ōban (Great Watch)
- Samurai
- Ninja

== Sources ==
- Bryant, Anthony J. (1995). Sekigahara 1600: The final struggle for power. Bloomsbury Publishing. ISBN 978-1-8553-2395-7. OL 8992865M.
- Connaughton, R. M. (1988). The War of the Rising Sun and the Tumbling Bear—A Military History of the Russo-Japanese War 1904–5. London. ISBN 0-415-00906-5.
- Davis, Paul K. (1999). "Sekigahara, 21 October 1600". 100 decisive battles : from ancient times to the present. New York : Oxford University Press. ISBN 978-0-19-514366-9. Paul Davis used the following sources to compile the chapter "Sekigahara, 21 October 1600" in 100 Decisive Battles: From Ancient Times to the Present "Sekigahara, 21 October 1600."
- Habu, Junko (29 July 2004), Ancient Jomon of Japan, Cambridge University Press, ISBN 978-0-521-77670-7
- Paine, S.C.M (2003). The Sino-Japanese War of 1894–1895: Perceptions, Power, and Primacy. Cambridge University Press. ISBN 978-0-521-81714-1.
- Peattie, Mark R (2007). Sunburst: The Rise of Japanese Naval Air Power, 1909–1941. Annapolis, Maryland: Naval Institute Press. ISBN 978-1612514369.
- Sansom, George (1978) [1961]. A History of Japan, 1334–1615. Stanford University Press. ISBN 0-8047-0525-9.
- Steinberg, John W.; et al., eds. (2005). The Russo-Japanese War in Global Perspective: World War Zero. History of Warfare/29. Vol. I. Leiden: Brill. ISBN 978-900414284-8.
  - Schimmelpenninck van der Oye, David. "The Immediate Origins of the War". In Steinberg et al. (2005).
  - Gary P. Cox (January 2006). "The Russo-Japanese War in Global Perspective: World War Zero (review)". The Journal of Military History. 70 (1): 250–251. doi:10.1353/jmh.2006.0037. S2CID 161979005.
- Turnbull, Stephen (1998). The Samurai Sourcebook. London: Cassell & Co.
- Turnbull, Stephen (2013). The Samurai: A Military History. Routledge.
