= Isao Machii =

Japanese swordsman (born 1973)

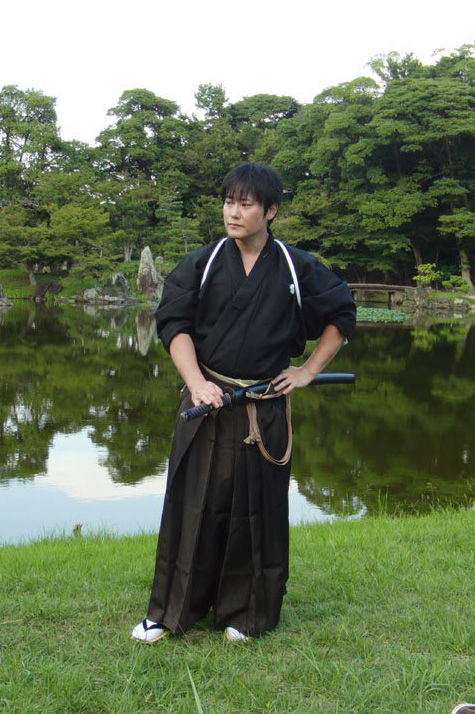
- Isao Machii, October 2011
- Born: August 20, 1973 (age 53); Japan
- Style: Iaido, Iaijutsu

Isao Machii (町井勲, Machii Isao; born August 20, 1973) is a Japanese Iaido master (Shūshinryū Iaijutsu hyōhō, Shūshin-kan head master) based in Kawanishi, Hyōgo, Japan.

He holds a number of Guinness World Records for his katana skills, including "Most martial arts katana cuts to one mat (suegiri)", "Fastest 1,000 martial arts sword cuts", "Most sword cuts to straw mats in three minutes", and "Fastest tennis ball (708km/h) cut by sword".
