= Katana =

Samurai sword

Katana (日本刀)
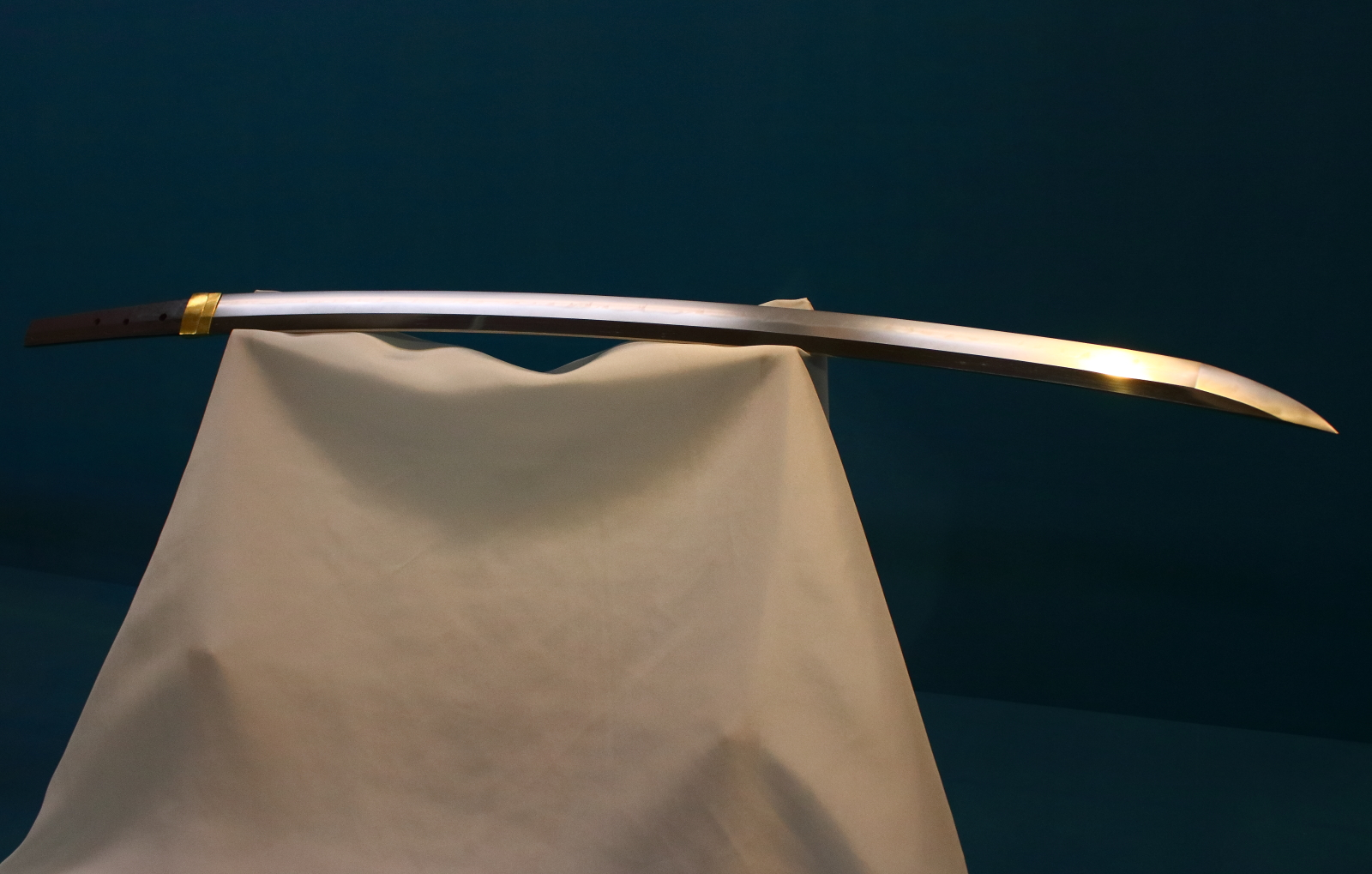
- A katana modified from a tachi forged by Motoshige. Bizen Osafune school influenced by the Sōshū school. 14th century, Nanboku-chō period. Important Cultural Property. Tokyo National Museum
- Type: Sword
- Place of origin: Japan

Service history
- Used by: Samurai, Daimyo, Shogun, onna-musha, ninja, kunoichi, kenjutsuka, iaijutsuka, iaidoka, and battōjutsuka

Production history
- Produced: Nanboku-chō period (1336–1392) which corresponds to the early Muromachi period (1336–1573) to present

Specifications
- Blade length: approx. 60–80 cm (24–31 in)
- Blade type: Curved, single-edged
- Hilt type: Two-handed swept, with circular or squared guard
- Scabbard/sheath: Lacquered wood, some are covered with fish skin, decorated with brass and copper.

A katana (刀, かたな; lit. 'one-sided blade') is a Japanese sword characterized by a curved, single-edged blade with a circular or squared guard and long grip to accommodate two hands. Developed later than the tachi, it was used by samurai in feudal Japan and worn with the edge facing upward. Since the Muromachi period, many old tachi were cut from the root and shortened, and the blade at the root was crushed and converted into a katana. The specific term for katana in Japan is uchigatana (打刀, うちがたな; lit. 'striking sword') and the term katana (刀) often refers to single-edged swords from around the world.

== Etymology and loanwords ==
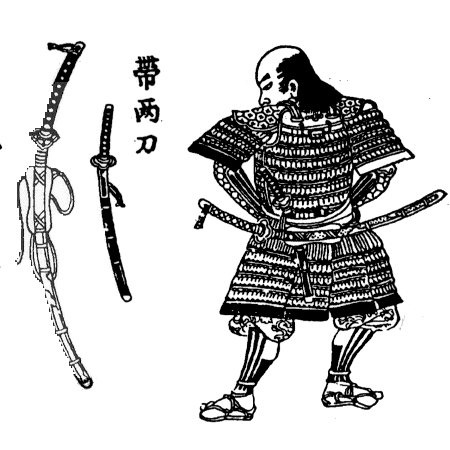
Japanese Edo period wood block print (ca 1735) of a samurai with a tachi and a wakizashi (or kodachi)

The word katana first appears in Japanese in the Nihon Shoki of 720. The term is a compound of kata ("one side, one-sided") + na ("blade"), in contrast to the double-sided tsurugi.

The katana belongs to the nihontō family of swords, and is distinguished by a blade length (nagasa) of more than 2 shaku, approximately 60 cm (24 in).

Katana can also be known as dai or daitō among Western sword enthusiasts, although daitō is a generic name for any Japanese long sword, literally meaning "big sword".

As Japanese does not have separate plural and singular forms, both katanas and katana are considered acceptable forms in English.

Pronounced [katana], the kun'yomi (Japanese reading) of the kanji 刀, originally meaning single edged blade (of any length) in Chinese, the word has been adopted as a loanword by the Portuguese. In Portuguese the designation (spelled catana) means "large knife" or machete.

== Description ==
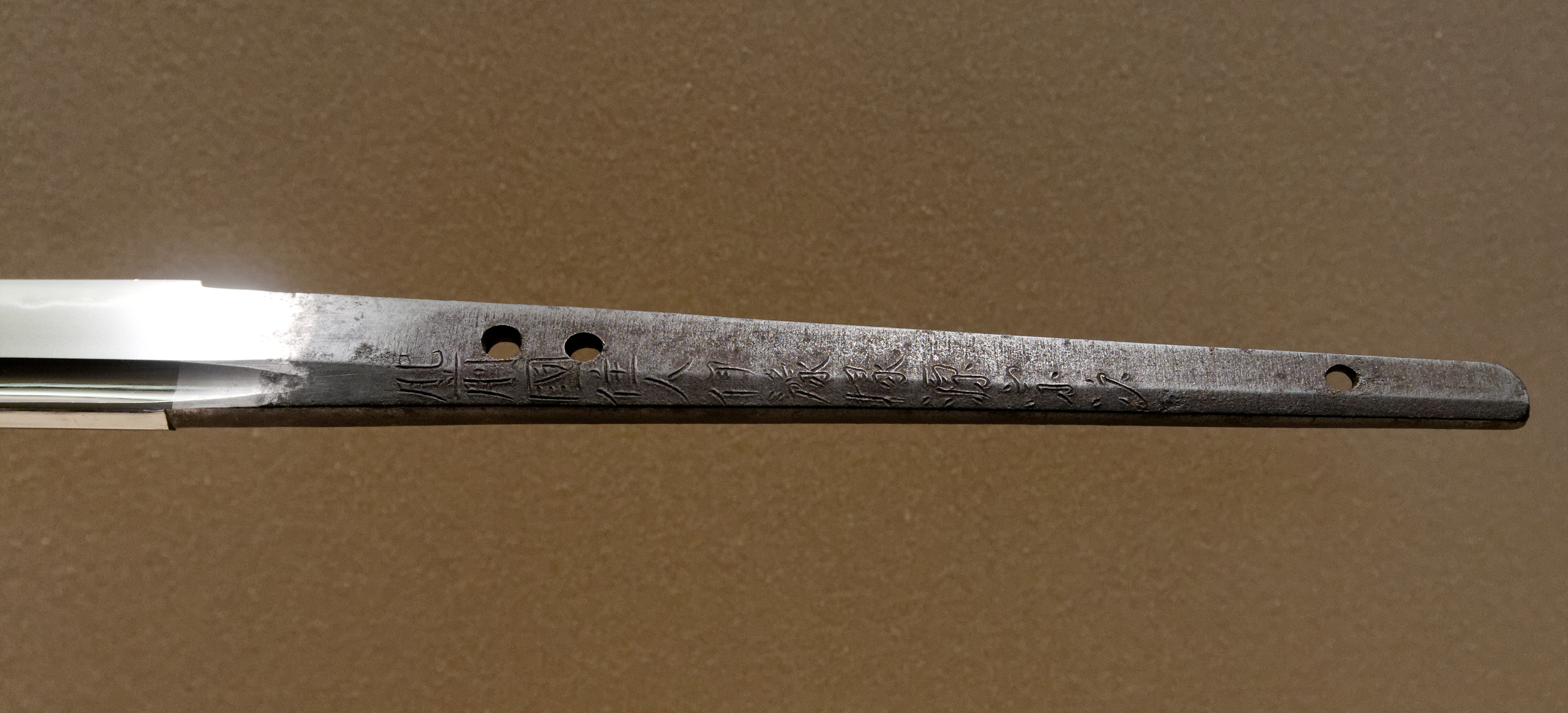
Mei (signature) and Nakago (tang) of an Edo period katana

The katana is generally defined as the standard sized, moderately curved (as opposed to the older tachi featuring more curvature) Japanese sword with a blade length greater than 60.6 cm (23.86 inches) (over 2 shaku). It is characterized by its distinctive appearance: a curved, slender, single-edged blade with a circular or squared guard (tsuba) and long grip to accommodate two hands.

With a few exceptions, katana and tachi can be distinguished from each other, if signed, by the location of the signature (mei) on the tang (nakago). In general, the mei should be carved into the side of the nakago which would face outward when the sword was worn. Since a tachi was worn with the cutting edge down, and the katana was worn with the cutting edge up, the mei would be in opposite locations on the tang.

Western historians have said that katana were among the finest cutting weapons in world military history. However, the main weapons on the battlefield in the Sengoku period in the 16th century were yumi (bow), yari (spear), and tanegashima (gun), and katana and tachi were used only for close combat. During this period, the tactics changed to a group battle by ashigaru (foot soldiers) mobilized in large numbers, so naginata and tachi became obsolete as weapons on the battlefield and were replaced by yari and katana. In the relatively peaceful Edo period, katana increased in importance as a weapon, and at the end of the Edo period, shishi (political activists) fought many battles using katana as their main weapon. Katana and tachi were often used as gifts between daimyo (feudal lord) and samurai, or as offerings to the kami enshrined in Shinto shrines, and symbols of authority and spirituality of samurai.

== History ==
The production of swords in Japan is divided into specific time periods:

- Jōkotō (ancient swords, until around 900)
- Kotō (old swords from around 900–1596)
- Shintō (new swords 1596–1780)
- Shinshintō (newer swords 1781–1876)
- Gendaitō (modern or contemporary swords 1876–present)
- Shinsakutō (newly made swords 1953–present)

=== Kotō (Old swords) ===
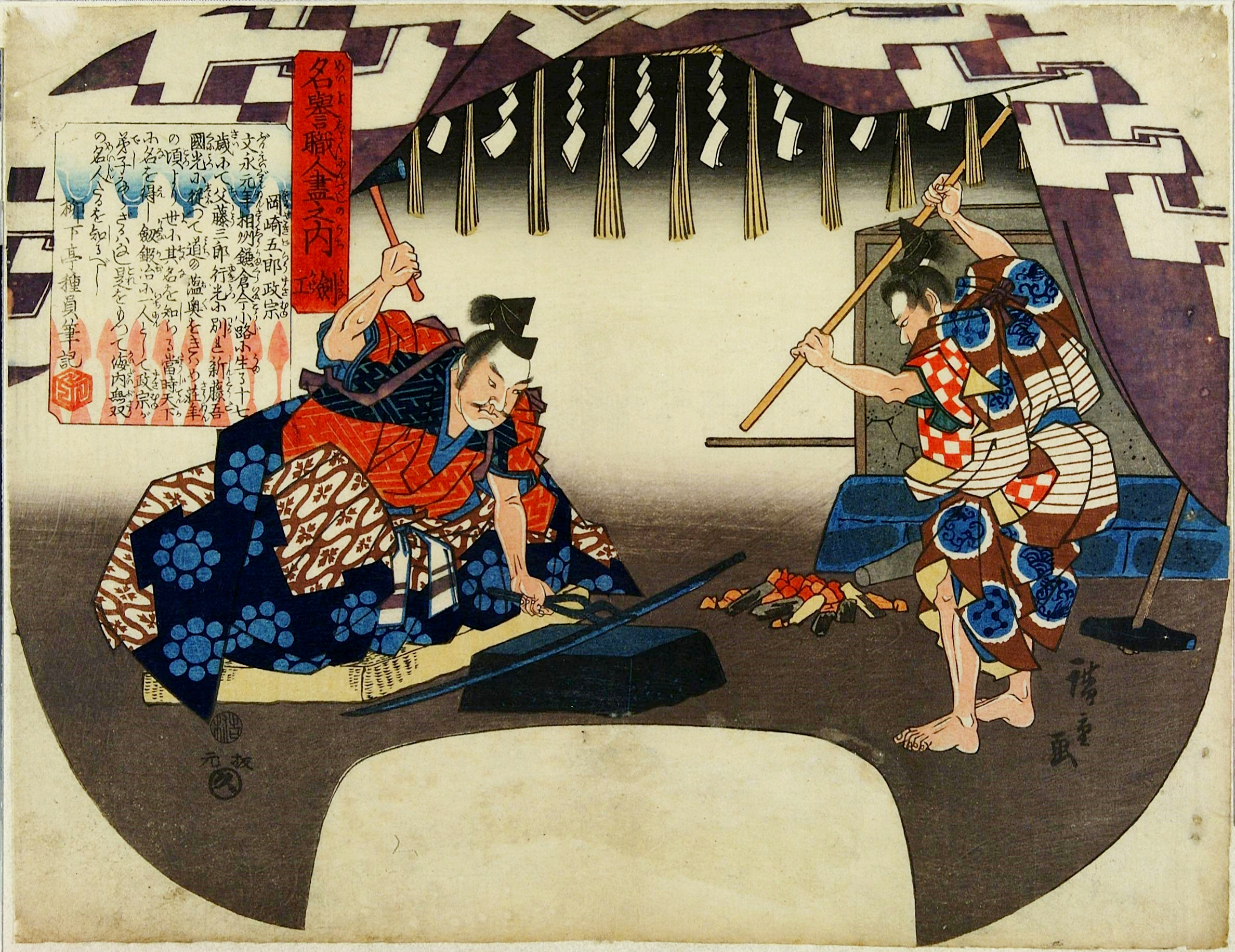
Masamune forges a katana with an assistant (ukiyo-e).

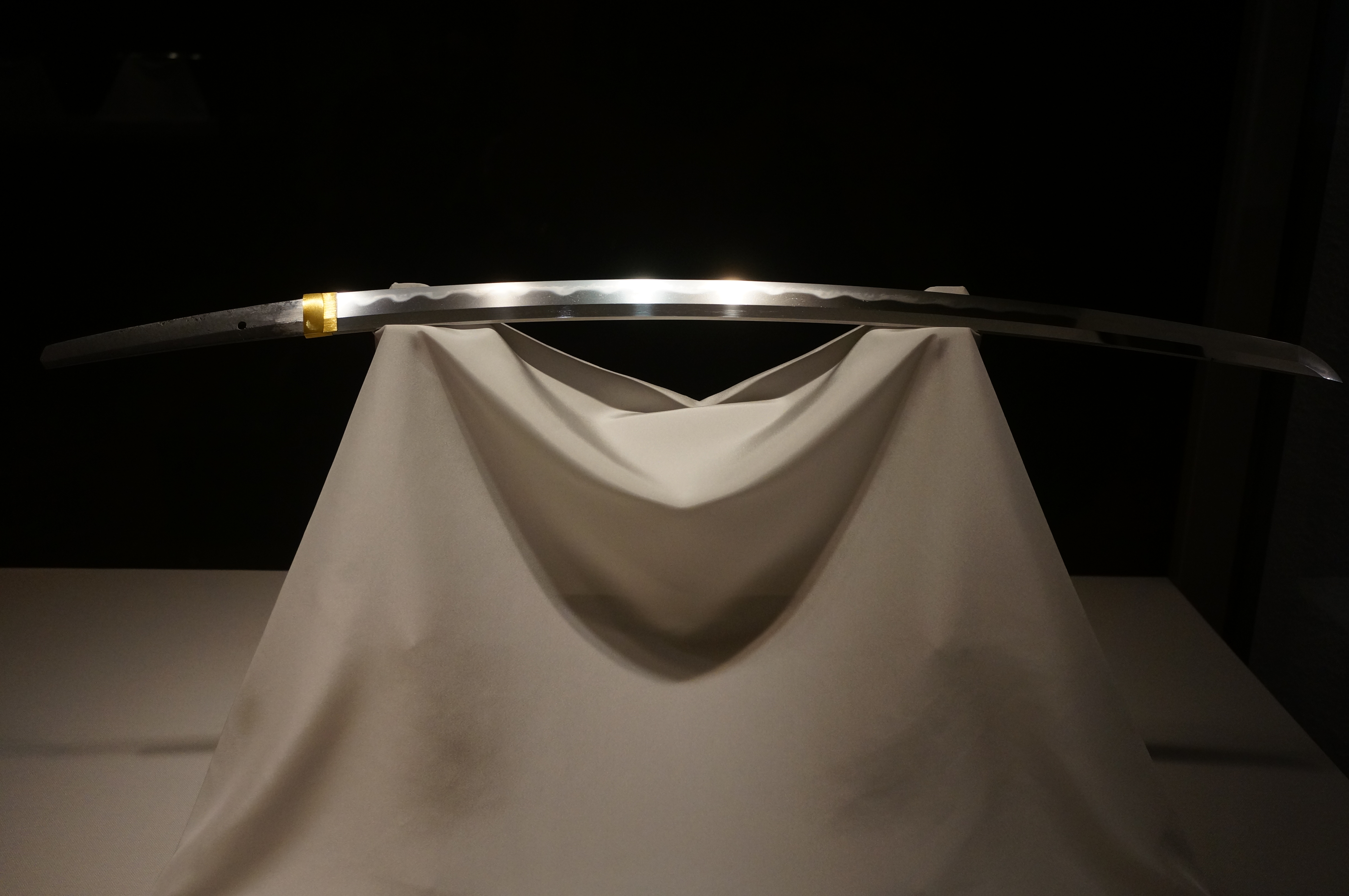
A Sōshū school katana modified from a tachi forged by Masamune. As it was owned by Ishida Mitsunari, it was commonly called Ishida Masamune. Important Cultural Property. Tokyo National Museum

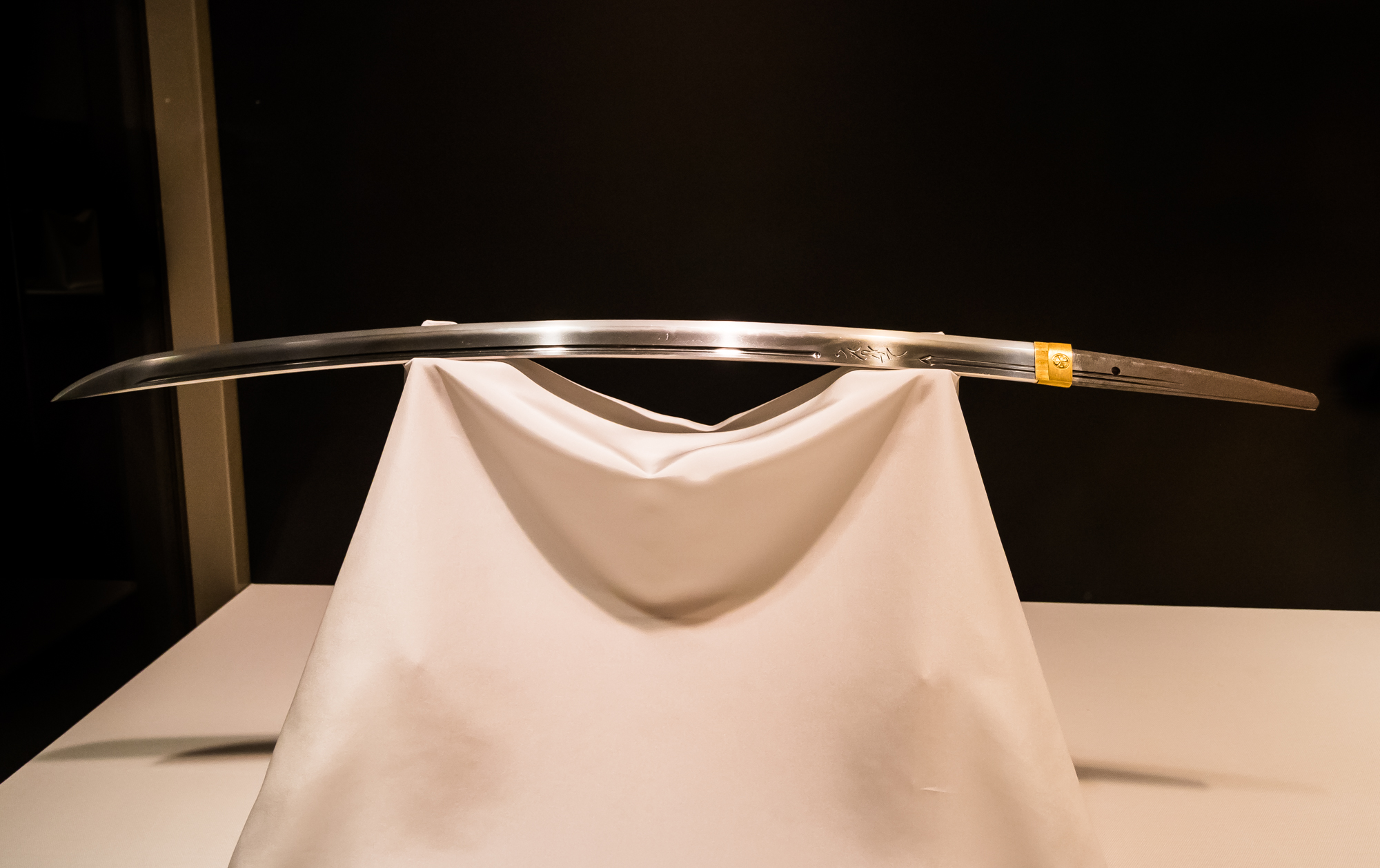
A Sōshū school katana modified from a tachi, Kiriha Sadamune, forged by Sadamune, son of Masamune. 14th century, Kamakura period. Important Cultural Property. Tokyo National Museum

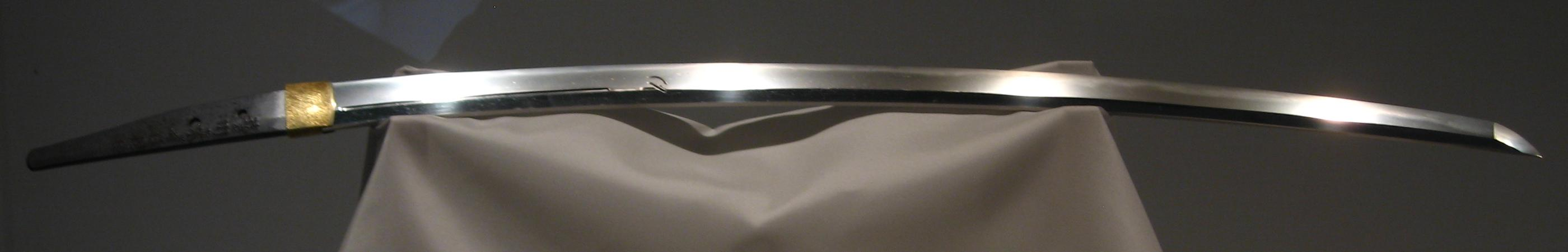
Muramasa (勢州桑名住村正) from the Tokyo National Museum

Katana originates from sasuga (刺刀), a kind of tantō (short sword or knife) used by lower-ranking samurai who fought on foot in the Kamakura period (1185–1333). Their main weapon was a long naginata and sasuga was a spare weapon. In the Nanboku-chō period (1336–1392) which corresponds to the early Muromachi period (1336–1573), long weapons such as ōdachi were popular, and along with this, sasuga were gradually lengthened and finally became katana. Also, there is a theory that koshigatana (腰刀), a kind of tantō which was equipped by high ranking samurai together with tachi, developed into katana through the same historical background as sasuga, and it is possible that both developed to katana. The oldest katana in existence today is called Hishizukuri uchigatana, which was forged in the Nanbokuchō period, and was dedicated to Kasuga Shrine later.

The first use of katana as a word to describe a long sword that was different from a tachi, occurs as early as the Kamakura period. These references to "uchigatana" and "tsubagatana" seem to indicate a different style of sword, possibly a less costly sword for lower-ranking warriors. Starting around the year 1400, long swords signed with the katana-style mei were made. This was in response to samurai wearing their tachi in what is now called "katana style" (cutting edge up). Japanese swords are traditionally worn with the mei facing away from the wearer. When a tachi was worn in the style of a katana, with the cutting edge up, the tachi's signature would be facing the wrong way. The fact that swordsmiths started signing swords with a katana signature shows that some samurai of that time period had started wearing their swords in a different manner.

By the 15th century, Japanese swords, including katana, had already gained international fame by being exported to China and Korea. For example, Korea learned how to make Japanese swords by sending swordsmiths to Japan and inviting Japanese swordsmiths to Korea. According to the record of June 1, 1430 in the Veritable Records of the Joseon Dynasty, a Korean swordsmith who went to Japan and mastered the method of making Japanese swords presented a Japanese sword to the King of Korea and was rewarded for the excellent work which was no different from the swords made by the Japanese.

Traditionally, yumi (bows) were the main weapon of war in Japan, and tachi and naginata were used only for close combat. The Ōnin War in the late 15th century in the Muromachi period expanded into a large-scale domestic war, in which employed farmers called ashigaru were mobilized in large numbers. They fought on foot using katana shorter than tachi. In the Sengoku period (period of warring states) in the late Muromachi period, the war became bigger and ashigaru fought in a close formation using yari (spears) lent to them. Furthermore, in the late 16th century, tanegashima (muskets) were introduced from Portugal, and Japanese swordsmiths mass-produced improved products, with ashigaru fighting with leased guns. On the battlefield in Japan, guns and spears became main weapons in addition to bows. Due to the changes in fighting styles in these wars, the tachi and naginata became obsolete among samurai, and the katana, which was easy to carry, became the mainstream. The dazzling looking tachi gradually became a symbol of the authority of high-ranking samurai.

On the other hand, kenjutsu (swordsmanship) that makes use of the characteristics of katana was invented. The quicker draw of the sword was well suited to combat where victory depended heavily on short response times. (The practice and martial art for drawing the sword quickly and responding to a sudden attack was called battōjutsu, which is still kept alive through the teaching of iaido.) The katana further facilitated this by being worn thrust through a belt-like sash (obi) with the sharpened edge facing up. Ideally, samurai could draw the sword and strike the enemy in a single motion. Previously, the curved tachi had been worn with the edge of the blade facing down and suspended from a belt.

From the 15th century, low-quality swords were mass-produced under the influence of the large-scale war. These swords, along with spears, were lent to recruited farmers called ashigaru and swords were exported. Such mass-produced swords are called kazuuchimono, and swordsmiths of the Bisen school and Mino school produced them by division of labor. The export of katana and tachi reached its peak during this period, from the late 15th century to early 16th century when at least 200,000 swords were shipped to Ming dynasty China in official trade in an attempt to soak up the production of Japanese weapons and make it harder for pirates in the area to arm. In the Ming dynasty of China, Japanese swords and their tactics were studied to repel pirates, and wodao and miaodao were developed based on Japanese swords.

From this period, the tang (nakago) of many old tachi were cut and shortened into katana. This kind of remake is called suriage (磨上げ). For example, many of the tachi that Masamune forged during the Kamakura period were converted into katana, so his only existing works are katana and tantō.

From around the 16th century, many Japanese swords were exported to Thailand, where katana-style swords were made and prized for battle and art work, and some of them are in the collections of the Thai royal family.

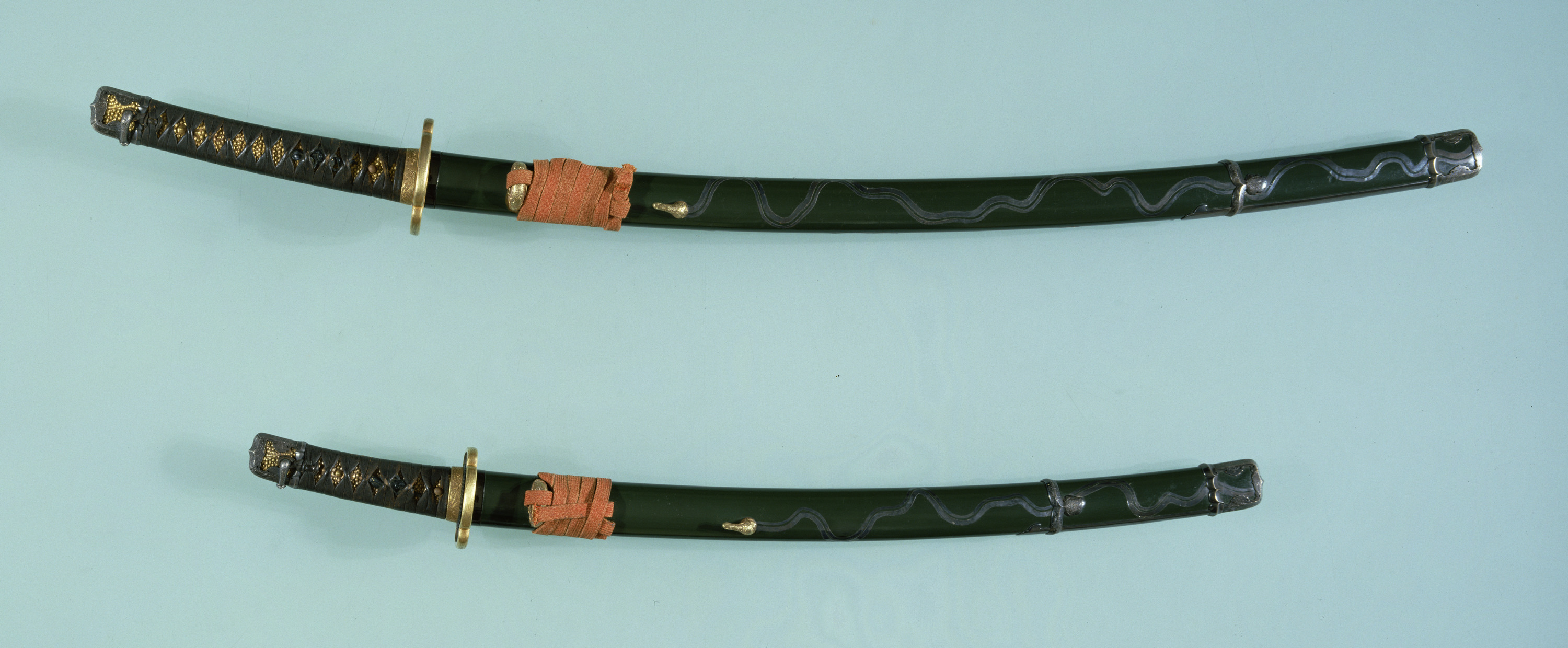
Daishō style handachi sword mounting. 16th–17th century, Azuchi–Momoyama or Edo period.

From the late Muromachi period (Sengoku period) to the early Edo period, samurai were sometimes equipped with a katana blade pointing downwards like a tachi. This style of sword is called handachi, "half tachi". In handachi, both styles were often mixed, for example, fastening to the obi was katana style, but metalworking of the scabbard was tachi style.

In the Muromachi period, especially the Sengoku period, people such as farmers, townspeople, and monks could have a sword. However, in 1588 Toyotomi Hideyoshi banned farmers from owning weapons and conducted a sword hunt to forcibly remove swords from anyone identifying as a farmer.

The length of the katana blade varied considerably during the course of its history. In the late 14th and early 15th centuries, katana blades tended to have lengths between 70 and 73 centimetres (28 and 29 in). During the early 16th century, the average length dropped about 10 centimetres (3.9 in), approaching closer to 60 centimetres (24 in). By the late 16th century, the average length had increased again by about 13 centimetres (5.1 in), returning to approximately 73 centimetres (29 in).

=== Shintō (New swords) ===
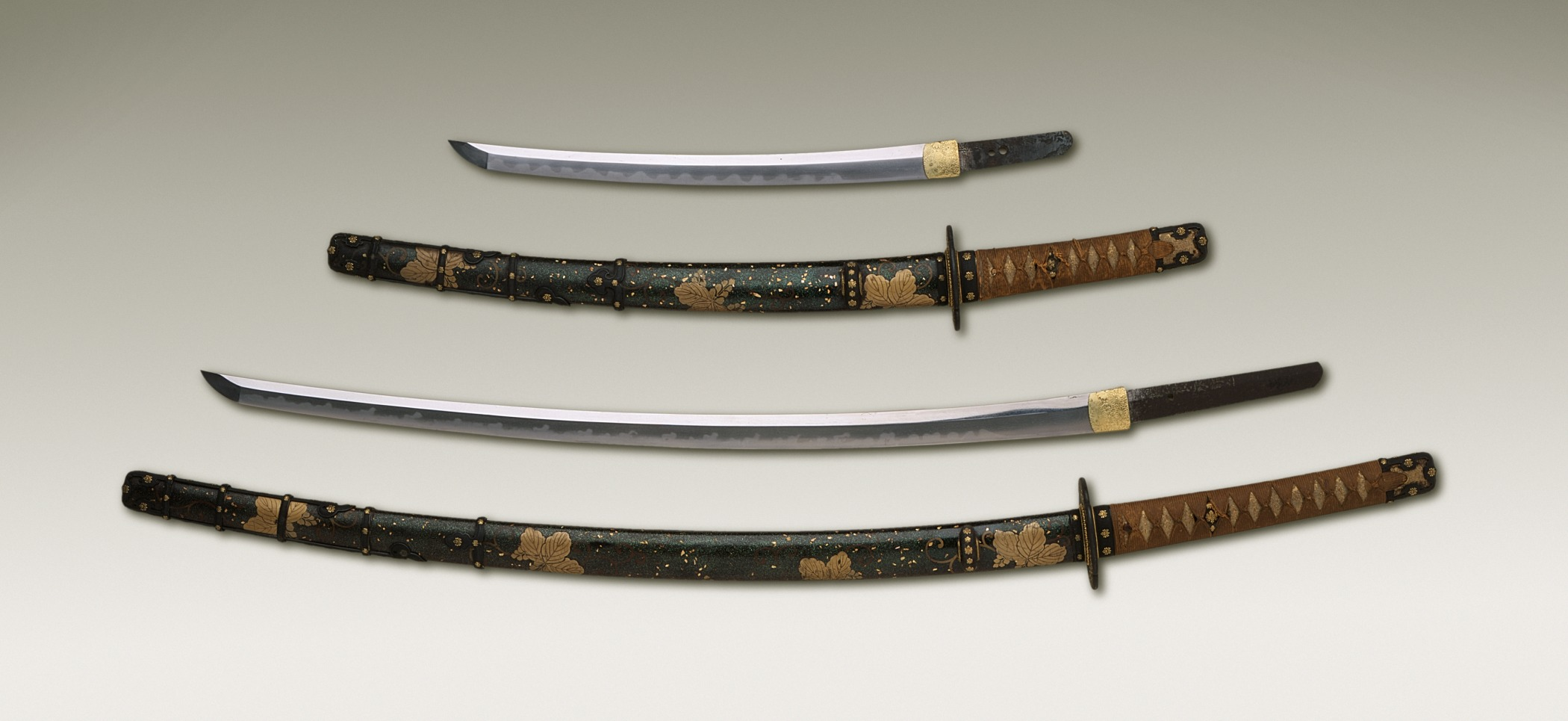
Antique Japanese daishō, the traditional pairing of two Japanese swords which were the symbol of the samurai, showing the traditional Japanese sword cases (koshirae) and the difference in size between the katana (bottom) and the smaller wakizashi (top)

Swords forged after 1596 in the Keichō period of the Azuchi–Momoyama period are classified as shintō (New swords). Japanese swords from shintō are different from kotō in forging method and steel (tamahagane). This is thought to be because Bizen school, which was the largest swordsmith group of Japanese swords, was destroyed by a great flood in 1590, and the mainstream shifted to Mino school, and because Toyotomi Hideyoshi virtually unified Japan, uniform steel began to be distributed throughout Japan. The kotō swords, especially the Bizen school swords made in the Kamakura period, had a midare-utsuri like a white mist between hamon and shinogi, but in the swords from shintō, it has almost disappeared. In addition, the whole body of the blade became whitish and hard. Almost no one was able to reproduce midare-utsurii until Kunihira Kawachi reproduced it in 2014.

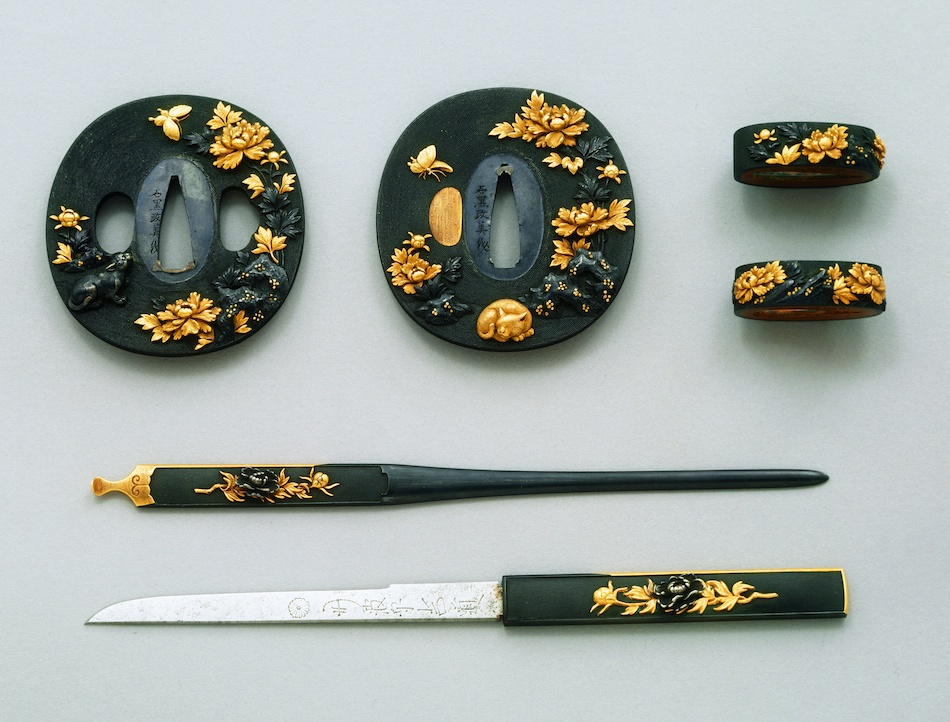
Sword fittings. Tsuba (top left) and fuchigashira (top right) made by Ishiguro Masayoshi in the 18th or 19th century. Kogai (middle) and kozuka (bottom) made by Yanagawa Naomasa in the 18th century, Edo period. Tokyo Fuji Art Museum.

As the Sengoku period (period of warring states) ended and the Azuchi-Momoyama period to the Edo period started, katana-forging also developed into a highly intricate and well-respected art form. Lacquered saya (scabbards), ornate engraved fittings, silk handles and elegant tsuba (handguards) were popular among samurai in the Edo period, and eventually (especially when Japan was in peace time), katana became more cosmetic and ceremonial items than practical weapons. The Umetada school led by Umetada Myoju who was considered to be the founder of shinto led the improvement of the artistry of Japanese swords in this period. They were both swordsmiths and metalsmiths, and were famous for carving the blade, making metal accouterments such as tsuba (handguard), remodeling from tachi to katana (suriage), and inscriptions inlaid with gold.

During this period, the Tokugawa shogunate required samurai to wear katana and shorter swords in pairs. These short swords were wakizashi and tantō, and wakizashi were mainly selected. This set of two is called a daishō. Only samurai could wear the daishō: it represented their social power and personal honour. Samurai could wear decorative sword mountings in their daily lives, but the Tokugawa shogunate regulated the formal sword that samurai wore when visiting a castle by regulating it as a daisho made of a black scabbard, a hilt wrapped with white ray skin and black string. Japanese swords made in this period are classified as shintō.

=== Shinshintō (New swords) ===
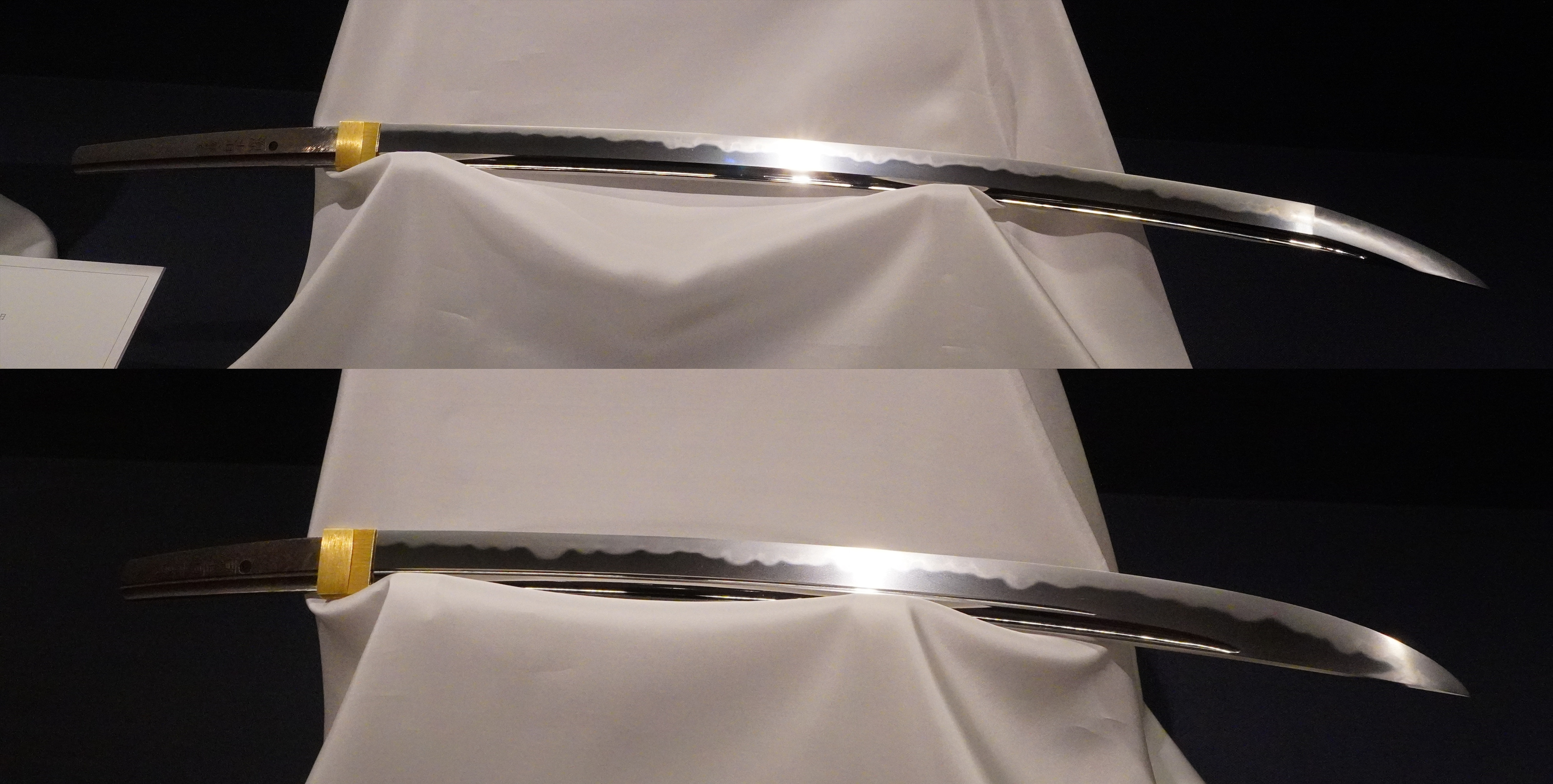
Daishō (Katana and Wakizashi) forged by Minamoto no Kiyomaro. 1848, Late Edo period. (not to scale)

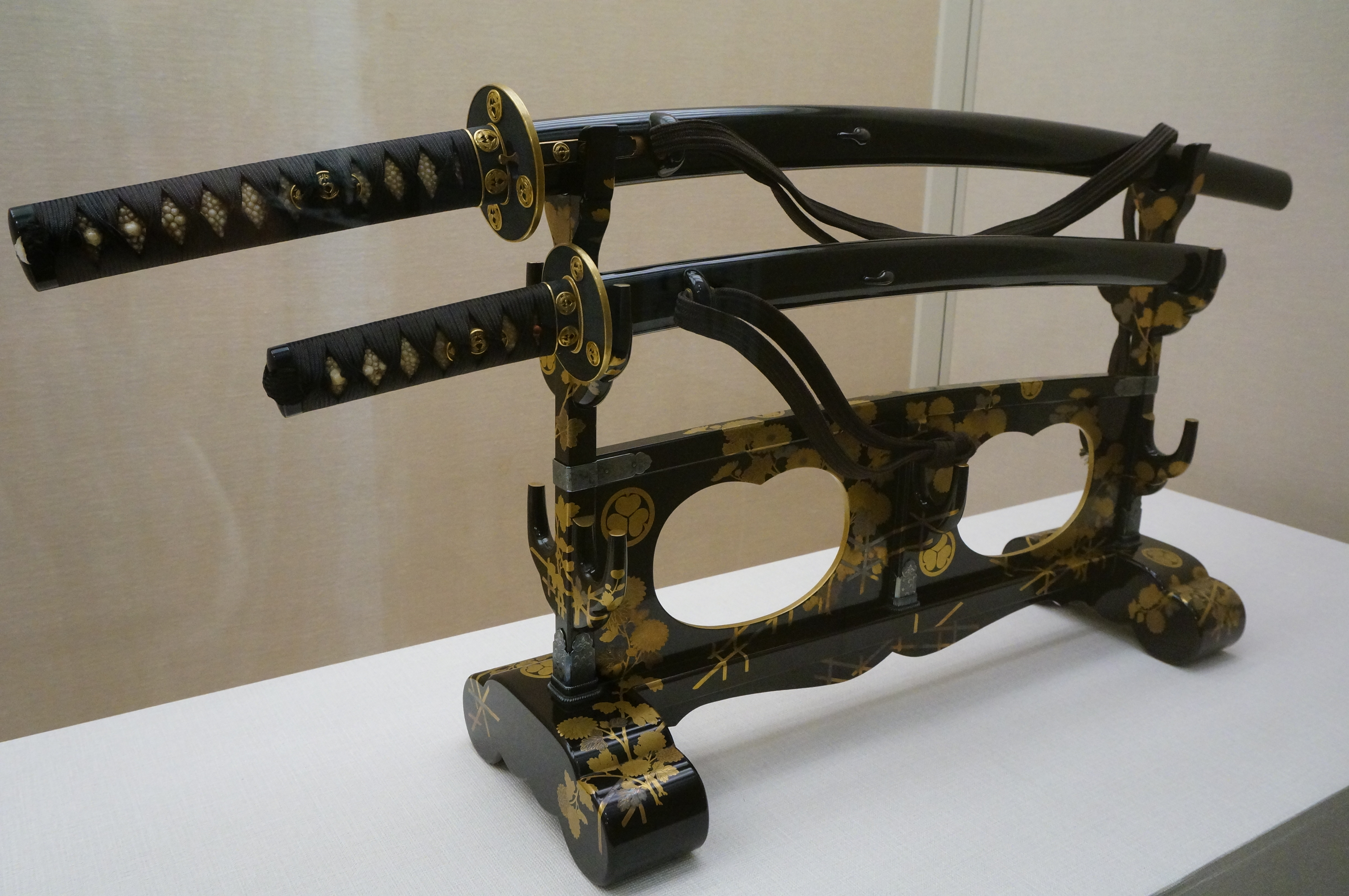
Daishō for formal attire with black scabbard, hilt winding thread and white ray skin hilt, which were regulated by the Tokugawa Shogunate. Daishō owned by Uesugi clan. Late Edo period.

In the late 18th century, swordsmith Suishinshi Masahide criticized that the present katana blades only emphasized decoration and had a problem with their toughness. He insisted that the bold and strong kotō blade from the Kamakura period to the Nanboku-chō period was the ideal Japanese sword, and started a movement to restore the production method and apply it to Katana. Katana made after this is classified as a shinshintō. One of the most popular swordsmiths in Japan today is Minamoto Kiyomaro who was active in this shinshintō period. His popularity is due to his timeless exceptional skill, as he was nicknamed "Masamune in Yotsuya" after his disastrous life. His works were traded at high prices and exhibitions were held at museums all over Japan from 2013 to 2014.

The idea that the blade of a sword in the Kamakura period is the best has been continued until now, and as of the 21st century, 80% of Japanese swords designated as National treasure in Japan were made in the Kamakura period, and 70% of them were tachi.

The arrival of Matthew Perry in 1853 and the subsequent Convention of Kanagawa caused chaos in Japanese society. Conflicts began to occur frequently between the forces of sonnō jōi (尊王攘夷派), who wanted to overthrow the Tokugawa Shogunate and rule by the Emperor, and the forces of sabaku (佐幕派), who wanted the Tokugawa Shogunate to continue. These political activists, called the shishi (志士), fought using a practical katana, called the kinnōtō (勤皇刀) or the bakumatsutō (幕末刀). Their katana were often longer than 90 cm (35.43 in) in blade length, less curved, and had a big and sharp point, which was advantageous for stabbing in indoor battles.

=== Gendaitō (modern or contemporary swords) ===
==== Meiji – World War II ====
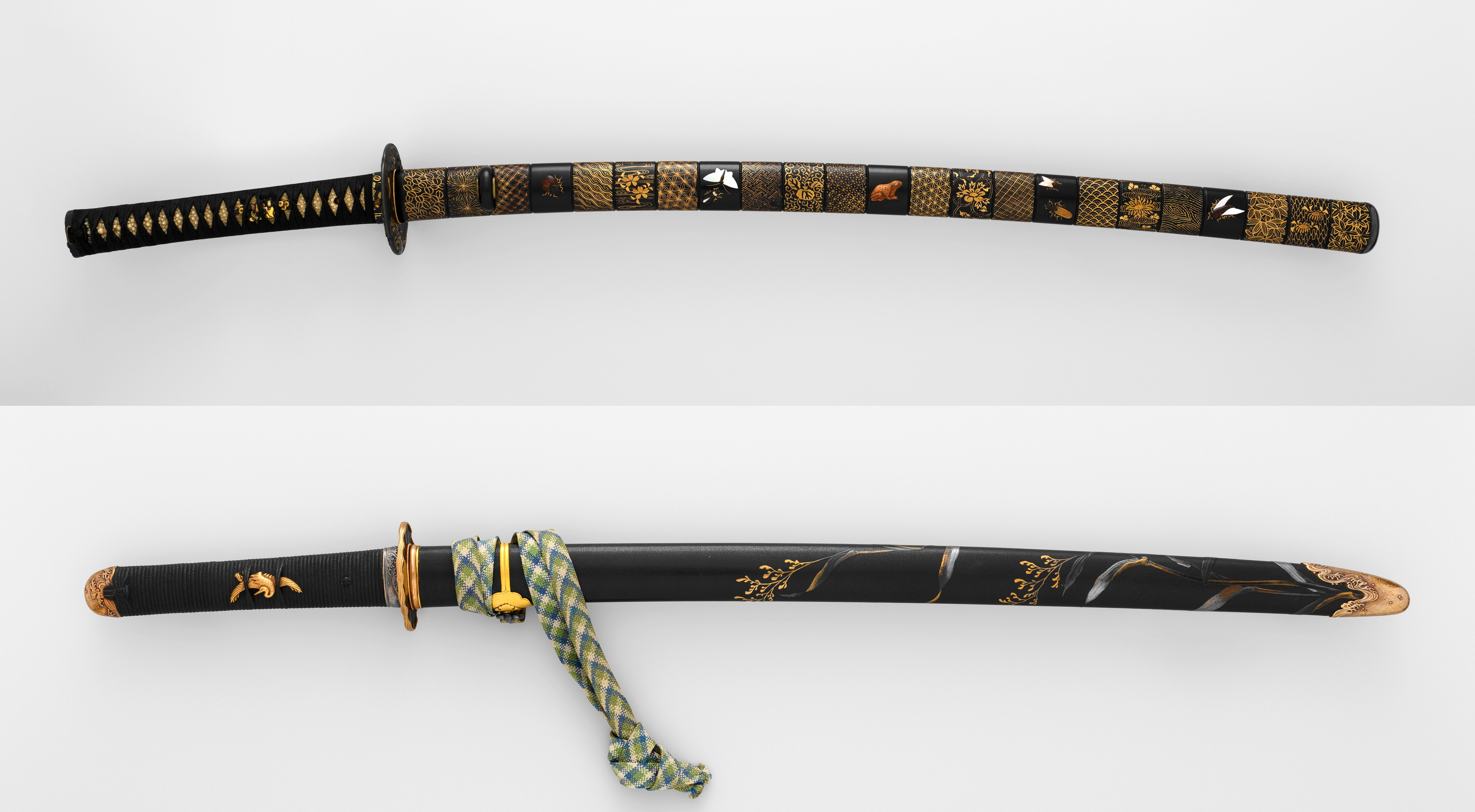
Katana mountings decorated with maki-e lacquer in the 1800s. Although the number of forged swords decreased in the Meiji period, many artistically excellent mountings were made.

During the Meiji period, the samurai class was gradually disbanded, and the special privileges granted to them were taken away, including the right to carry swords in public. The Haitōrei Edict in 1876 forbade the carrying of swords in public except for certain individuals, such as former samurai lords (daimyō), the military, and the police. In 1889, the army adopted a French-style sword that could be wielded with one hand. The katana was deemed unfit for modern war because it needed two hands to be used properly.

Skilled swordsmiths had trouble making a living during this period as Japan modernized its military, and many swordsmiths started making other items, such as farm equipment, tools, and cutlery. The craft of making swords was kept alive through the efforts of some individuals, notably Miyamoto Kanenori (宮本包則, 1830–1926) and Gassan Sadakazu (月山貞一, 1836–1918), who were appointed Imperial Household Artist. The businessman Mitsumura Toshimo (光村利藻, 1877－1955) tried to preserve their skills by ordering swords and sword mountings from the swordsmiths and craftsmen. He was especially enthusiastic about collecting sword mountings, and he collected about 3,000 precious sword mountings from the end of the Edo period to the Meiji period. About 1,200 items from a part of his collection are now in the Nezu Museum.

Military action by Japan in China and Russia during the Meiji period helped revive interest in swords, but it was not until the Shōwa period that swords were produced on a large scale again. Japanese military swords produced between 1875 and 1945 are referred to as guntō (military swords).

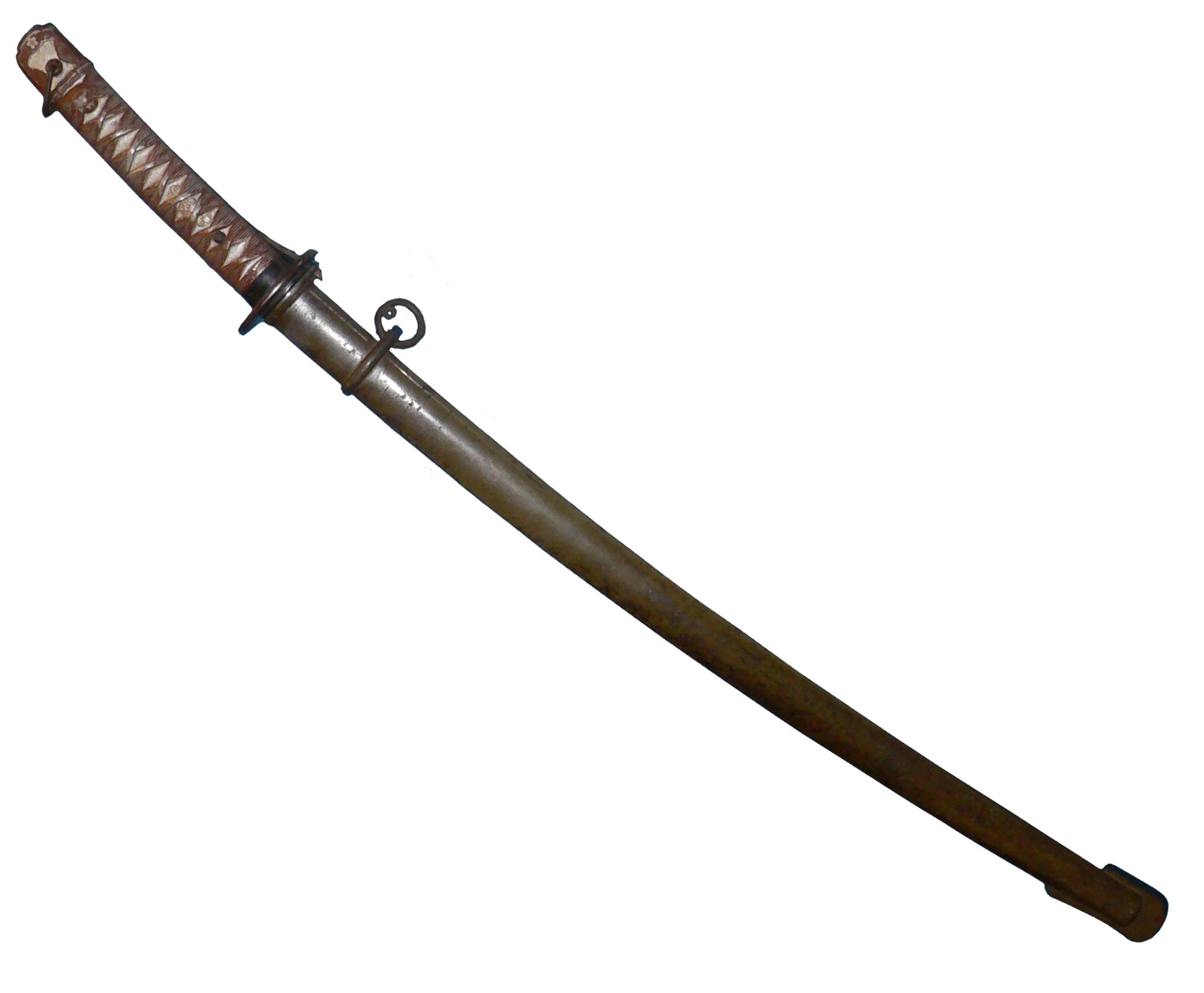
Type 95, World War II era guntō

During the pre-World War II military buildup, and throughout the war, all Japanese officers were required to wear a sword. Traditionally made swords were produced during this period, but in order to supply such large numbers of swords, blacksmiths with little or no knowledge of traditional Japanese sword manufacture were also recruited. In addition, supplies of the Japanese steel (tamahagane) used for swordmaking were limited, so several other types of steel were also used. Quicker methods of forging were also used, such as the use of power hammers, and quenching the blade in oil, rather than hand forging and water. The non-traditionally made swords from this period are called shōwatō, after the regnal name of the Emperor Hirohito, and in 1937, the Japanese government started requiring the use of special stamps on the tang (nakago) to distinguish these swords from traditionally made swords. During this period of war, older antique swords were remounted for use in military mounts. Presently, in Japan, shōwatō are not considered to be "true" Japanese swords, and they can be confiscated. Outside Japan, however, they are collected as historical artifacts.

Shinsakutō (newly made swords)

==== Post–World War II ====
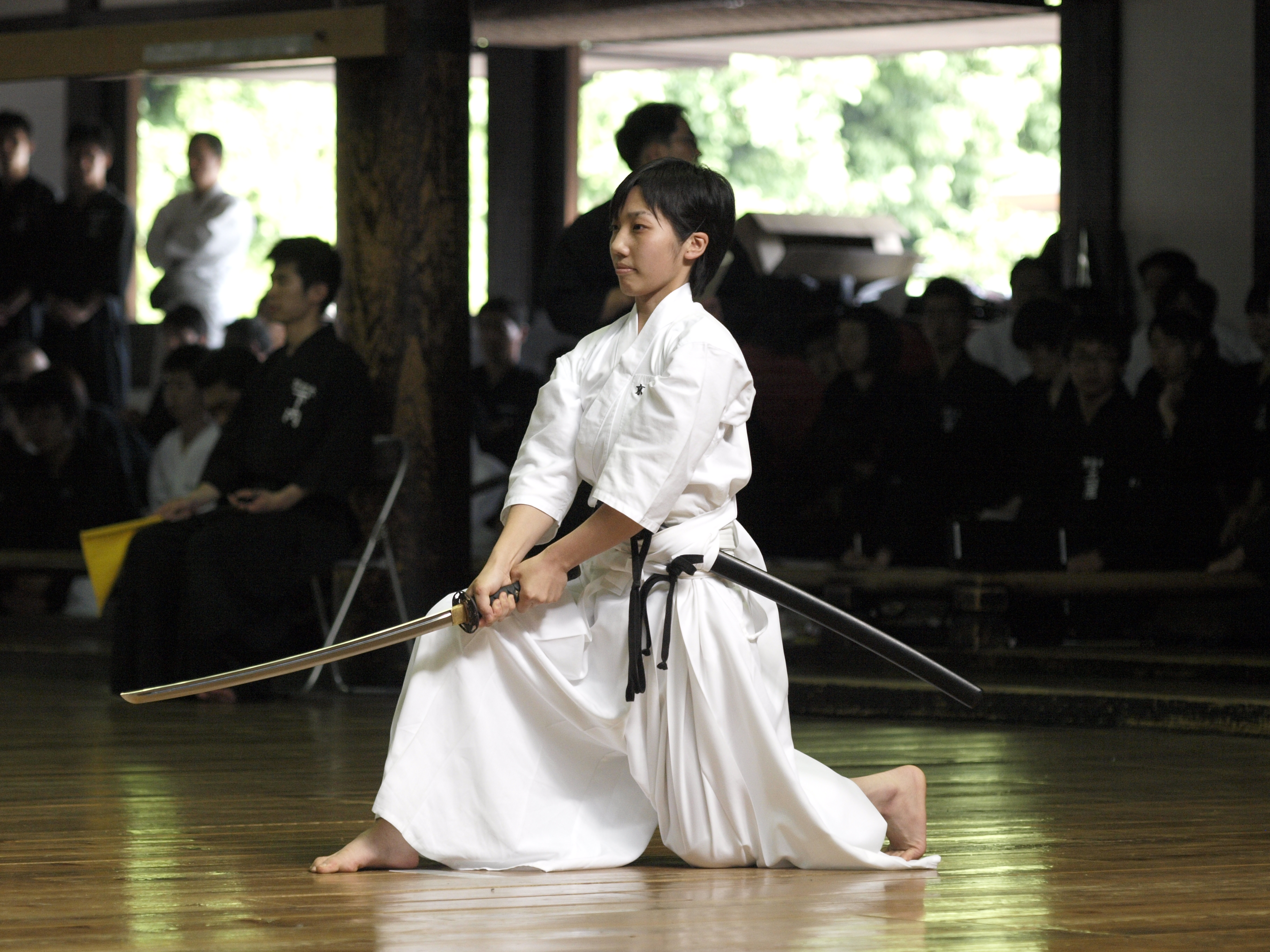
Japanese girl practicing iaidō with a modern training katana or iaitō. This sword was custom-made in Japan to suit the weight and size of the student. The blade is made of aluminum alloy and lacks a sharp edge for safety reasons.

Between 1945 and 1953, sword manufacture and sword-related martial arts were banned in Japan. Many swords were confiscated and destroyed, and swordsmiths were not able to make a living. Since 1953, Japanese swordsmiths have been allowed to work, but with severe restrictions: swordsmiths must be licensed and serve a five-year apprenticeship, and only licensed swordsmiths are allowed to produce Japanese swords (nihonto), only two longswords per month are allowed to be produced by each swordsmith, and all swords must be registered with the Japanese Government.

Outside Japan, some of the modern katanas being produced by western swordsmiths use modern steel alloys, such as L6 and A2. These modern swords replicate the size and shape of the Japanese katana and are used by martial artists for iaidō and even for cutting practice (tameshigiri).

Mass-produced swords including iaitō and shinken in the shape of katana are available from many countries, though China dominates the market. These types of swords are typically mass-produced and made with a wide variety of steels and methods.

According to the Parliamentary Association for the Preservation and Promotion of Japanese Swords, organized by Japanese Diet members, many katana distributed around the world as of the 21st century are fake Japanese swords made in China. The Sankei Shimbun analyzed that this is because the Japanese government allowed swordsmiths to make only 24 Japanese swords per person per year in order to maintain the quality of Japanese swords.

Many swordsmiths after the Edo period have tried to reproduce the sword of the Kamakura period which is considered as the best sword in the history of Japanese swords, but they have failed. Then, in 2014, Kunihira Kawachi succeeded in reproducing it and won the Masamune Prize, the highest honor as a swordsmith. No one could win the Masamune Prize unless he made an extraordinary achievement, and in the section of tachi and katana, no one had won for 18 years before Kawauchi.

== Types ==
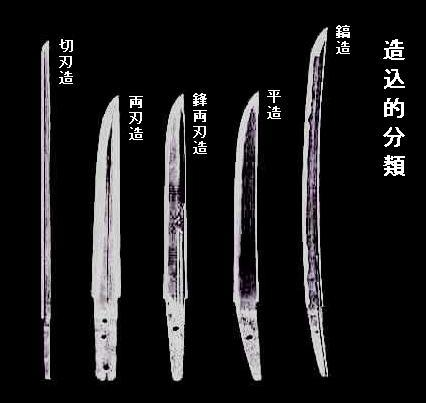
Kiriha-zukuri, Moroha-zukuri, Kissaki-moroha-zukuri, Hira-zukuri and Shinogi-zukuri (left to right). The one on the left is chokutō and the three in the middle are tantō.

Katana are distinguished by their type of blade:

- Shinogi-Zukuri is the most common blade shape for Japanese katana that provides both speed and cutting power. It features a distinct yokote: a line or bevel that separates the finish of the main blade and the finish of the tip. Shinogi-zukuri was originally produced after the Heian period.
- Shobu-Zukuri is a variation of shinogi-zukuri without a yokote, the distinct angle between the long cutting edge and the point section. Instead, the edge curves smoothly and uninterrupted into the point.
- Kissaki-Moroha-Zukuri is a katana blade shape with a distinctive curved and double-edged blade. One edge of the blade is shaped in normal katana fashion while the tip is symmetrical and both edges of the blade are sharp.

In addition to these, there are various other types of blades with different shapes, such as Osoraku-zukuri, Unokubi-zukuri, and Kammuri-otoshi-zukuri.

== Forging and construction ==
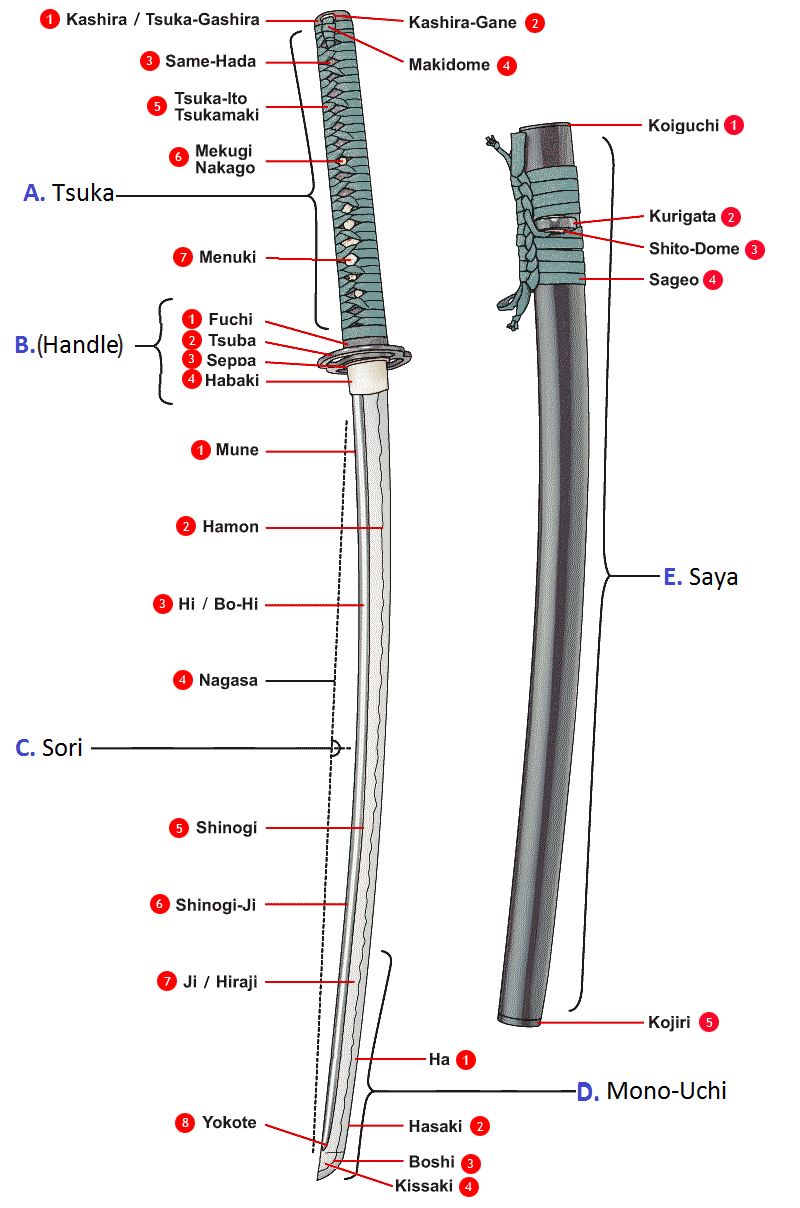
Named parts of a katana

Cross sections of Japanese sword blade lamination methods

Typical features of Japanese swords represented by katana and tachi are a three-dimensional cross-sectional shape of an elongated pentagonal to hexagonal blade called shinogi-zukuri, a style in which the blade and the tang (nakago) are integrated and fixed to the hilt (tsuka) with a pin called mekugi, and a gentle curve. When a shinogi-zukuri sword is viewed from the side, there is a ridge line of the thickest part of the blade called shinogi between the cutting-edge side and the back side. This shinogi contributes to lightening and toughening of the blade and high cutting ability.

Katana are traditionally made from a specialized Japanese steel called tamahagane, which is created from a traditional smelting process that results in several, layered steels with different carbon concentrations. This process helps remove impurities and even out the carbon content of the steel. The age of the steel plays a role in the ability to remove impurities, with older steel having a higher oxygen concentration, being more easily stretched and rid of impurities during hammering, resulting in a stronger blade. The smith begins by folding and welding pieces of the steel several times to work out most of the differences in the steel. The resulting block of steel is then drawn out to form a billet.

At this stage, it is only slightly curved or may have no curve at all. The katana's gentle curvature is attained by a process of differential hardening or differential quenching: the smith coats the blade with several layers of a wet clay slurry, which is a special concoction unique to each sword maker, but generally composed of clay, water and any or none of ash, grinding stone powder, or rust. This process is called tsuchioki. The edge of the blade is coated with a thinner layer than the sides and spine of the sword, heated, and then quenched in water (few sword makers use oil to quench the blade). The slurry causes only the blade's edge to be hardened and also causes the blade to curve due to the difference in densities of the micro-structures in the steel. When steel with a carbon content of 0.7% is heated beyond 750 °C (1,380 °F), it enters the austenite phase. When austenite is cooled very suddenly by quenching in water, the structure changes into martensite, which is a very hard form of steel. When austenite is allowed to cool slowly, its structure changes into a mixture of ferrite and pearlite which is softer than martensite.

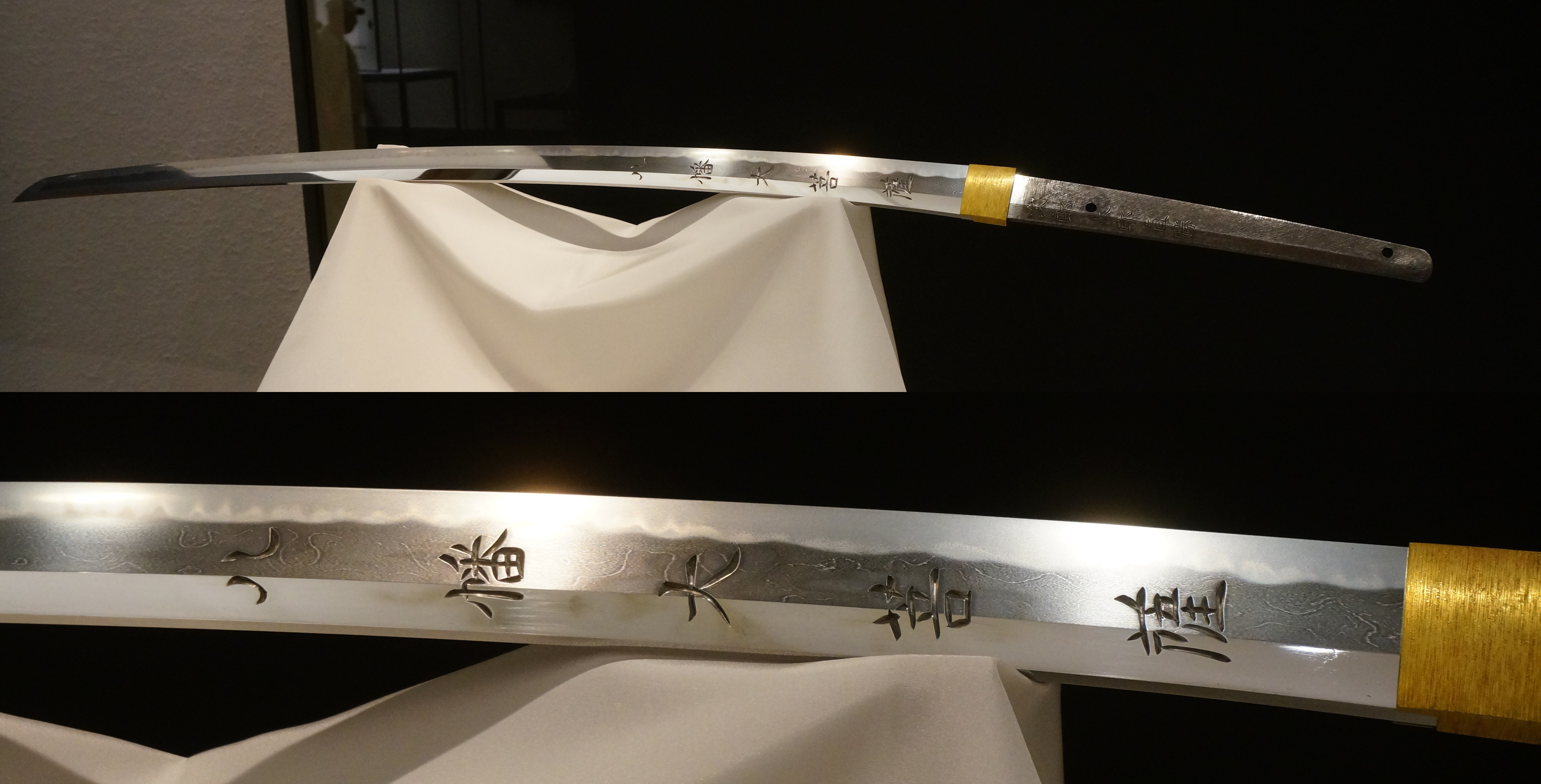
Example of a hamon. It is not the entire white hadori area, but a fuzzy line within the hadori. It is difficult to photograph, and to appreciate hamon, the viewer must hold the sword in his hand and change the angle of the light on the blade as he views it.

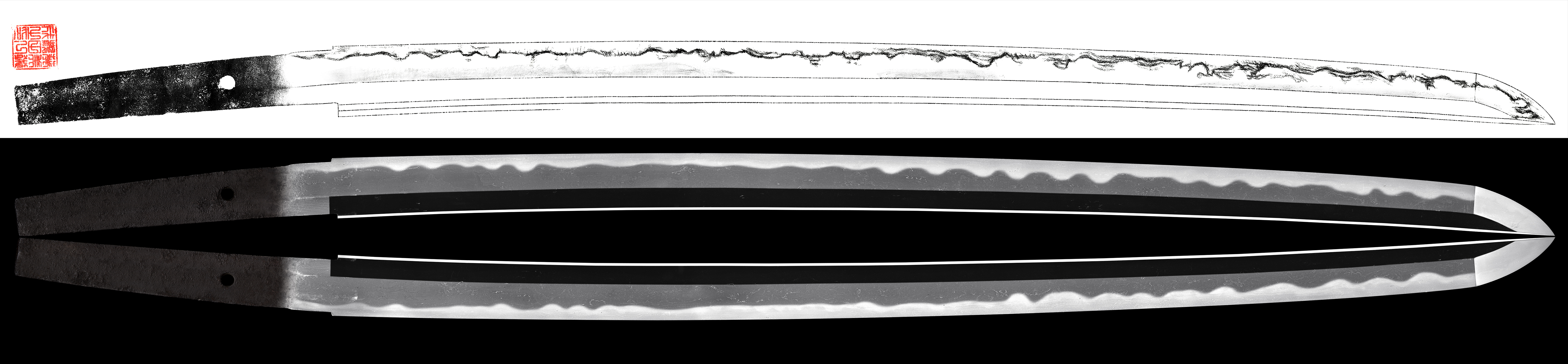
Difference between Oshigata (top), an exact copy of hamon, and the photograph (bottom).

This process also creates the line down the sides of the blade called the hamon, which is made distinct by polishing. Each hamon and each smith's style of hamon is distinct. Hamon does not refer to the white area on the side of the blade. The white part is the part that is whitened by a polishing process called hadori to make it easier to see the hamon, and the actual hamon is a fuzzy line within the white part. The actual line of the hamon can be seen by holding the sword in your hand and looking at it while changing the angle of the light shining on the blade.

After the blade is forged, it is then sent to be polished. The polishing takes between one and three weeks. The polisher uses a series of successively finer grains of polishing stones in a process called glazing, until the blade has a mirror finish. However, the blunt edge of the katana is often given a matte finish to emphasize the hamon.

Japanese swords are generally made by a division of labor between six and eight craftsmen. Tosho (Toko, Katanakaji) is in charge of forging blades, togishi is in charge of polishing blades, kinkōshi (chokinshi) is in charge of making metal fittings, shiroganeshi is in charge of making habaki (blade collar), sayashi is in charge of making scabbards, nurishi is in charge of applying lacquer to scabbards, tsukamakishi is in charge of making hilts, and tsubashi is in charge of making tsuba (hand guards). Tosho use apprentice swordsmiths as assistants. Prior to the Muromachi period, tosho and kacchushi (armorer) used surplus metal to make tsuba, but from the Muromachi period onwards, specialized craftsmen began to make tsuba. Nowadays, kinkōshi sometimes also serves as shiroganeshi and tsubashi.

== Appreciation ==
Historically, katana have been regarded not only as weapons but also as works of art, especially for high-quality ones. For a long time, Japanese people have developed a unique appreciation method in which the blade is regarded as the core of their aesthetic evaluation rather than the sword mountings decorated with luxurious lacquer or metal works.

It is said that there are three objects that are the most noteworthy when appreciating a blade. The first is the overall shape referred to as sugata which is the curvature, length, width, tip, and shape of tang of the sword. The second is a fine pattern on the surface of the blade, which is referred to as hada or jigane. By repeatedly folding and forging the blade, fine patterns such as fingerprints, tree rings and bark are formed on its surface. The third is hamon. Hamon is a fuzzy line in the white pattern of the cutting edge produced by quenching and tempering. The object of appreciation is the shape of hamon and the crystal particles formed at the boundary of hamon. Depending on the size of the particles, they can be divided into two types, a nie and a nioi, which makes them look like stars or mist. The pattern, nie and nioi of the hamon are generally difficult to see, and the viewer usually holds the sword in his hand, changing the angle of the light as it hits the blade. In addition to these three objects, a swordsmith signature and a file pattern engraved on tang, and a carving inscribed on the blade, which is referred to as horimono, are also the objects of appreciation.

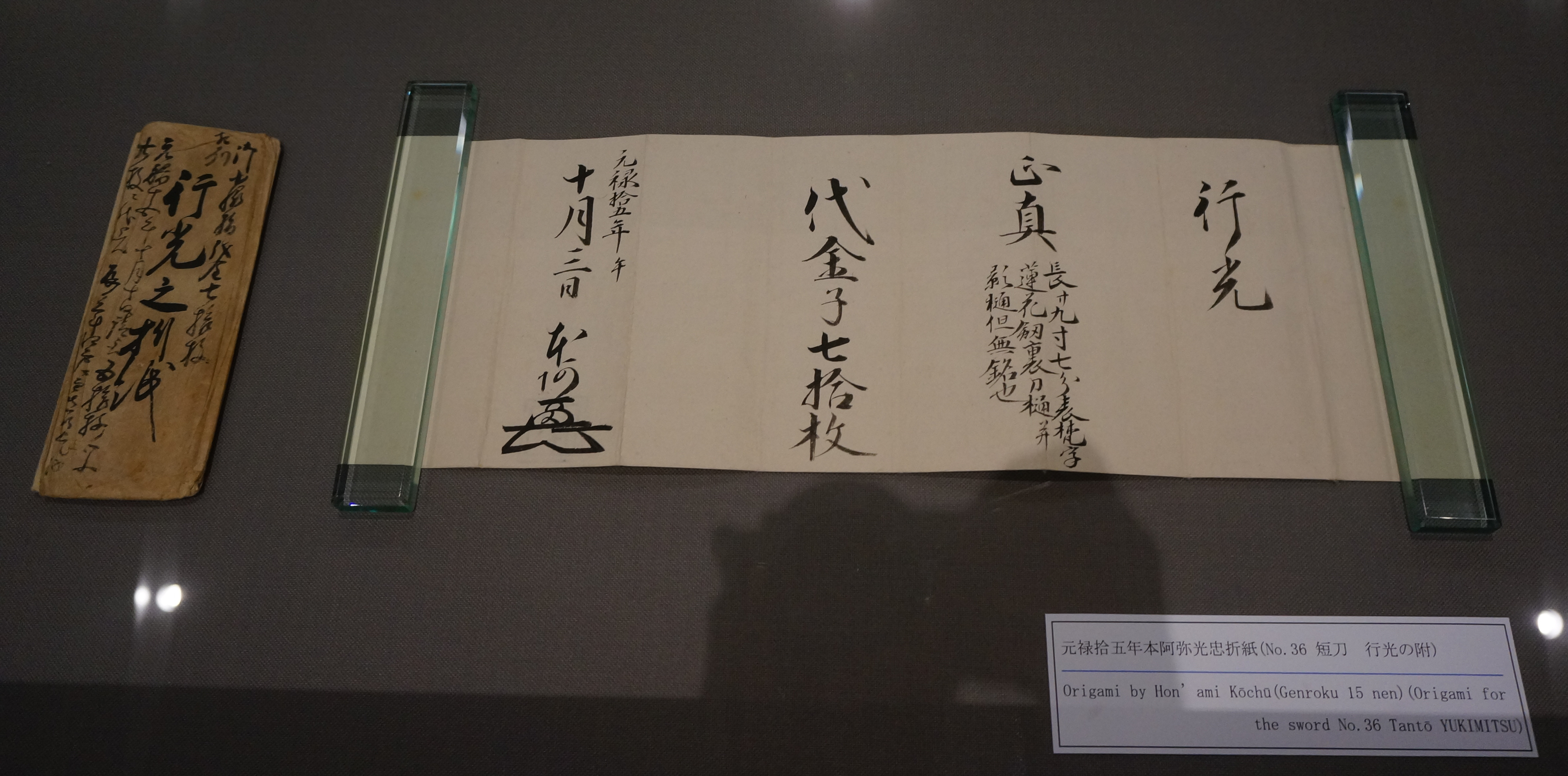
A Japanese sword authentication paper (origami) from 1702 that Hon'ami Kōchū certified a tantō made by Yukimitsu in the 14th century as authentic

The Hon'ami clan, which was an authority of appraisal of Japanese swords, rated Japanese swords from these artistic points of view. In addition, experts of modern Japanese swords judge when and by which swordsmith school the sword was made from these artistic points of view.

Generally, the blade and the sword mounting of Japanese swords are displayed separately in museums, and this tendency is remarkable in Japan. For example, the Nagoya Japanese Sword Museum "Nagoya Touken World", one of Japan's largest sword museums, posts separate videos of the blade and the sword mounting on its official website and YouTube.

== Rating of Japanese swords and swordsmiths ==
In Japan, Japanese swords are rated by authorities of each period, and some of the authority of the rating is still valid today.

In 1719, Tokugawa Yoshimune, the 8th shogun of the Tokugawa shogunate, ordered Hon'ami Kōchū, who was an authority of sword appraisal, to record swords possessed by daimyo all over Japan in books. In the completed "Kyōhō Meibutsu Chō" (享保名物帳) 249 precious swords were described, and additional 25 swords were described later. The list also includes 81 swords that had been destroyed in previous fires. The precious swords described in this book were called "Meibutsu" (名物) and the criteria for selection were artistic elements, origins and legends. The list of "Meibutsu" includes 59 swords made by Masamune, 34 by Awataguchi Yoshimitsu and 22 by Go Yoshihiro, and these three swordsmiths were considered special. Daimyo hid some swords for fear that they would be confiscated by the Tokugawa Shogunate, so even some precious swords were not listed in the book. For example, Daihannya Nagamitsu and Yamatorige, which are now designated as National Treasures, were not listed.

Yamada Asaemon V, who was the official sword cutting ability examiner and executioner of the Tokugawa shogunate, published a book "Kaiho Kenjaku" (懐宝剣尺) in 1797 in which he ranked the cutting ability of swords. The book lists 228 swordsmiths, whose forged swords are called "Wazamono" (業物) and the highest "Saijo Ō Wazamono" (最上大業物) has 12 selected. In the reprinting in 1805, one swordsmith was added to the highest grade, and in the major revised edition in 1830 "Kokon Kajibiko" (古今鍛冶備考), two swordsmiths were added to the highest grade, and in the end, 15 swordsmiths were ranked as the highest grade. The katana forged by Nagasone Kotetsu, one of the top-rated swordsmith, became very popular at the time when the book was published, and many counterfeits were made. In these books, the three swordsmiths treated specially in "Kyōhō Meibutsu Chō" and Muramasa, who was famous at that time for forging swords with high cutting ability, were not mentioned. The reasons for this are considered to be that Yamada was afraid of challenging the authority of the shogun, that he could not use the precious sword possessed by the daimyo in the examination, and that he was considerate of the legend of Muramasa's curse.

At present, by the Law for the Protection of Cultural Properties, important swords of high historical value are designated as Important Cultural Properties (Jūyō Bunkazai, 重要文化財), and special swords among them are designated as National Treasures (Kokuhō, 国宝). The swords designated as cultural properties based on the law of 1930, which was already abolished, have the rank next to Important Cultural Properties as Important Art Object (Jūyō Bijutsuhin, 重要美術品). In addition, the Society for Preservation of Japanese Art Swords, a public interest incorporated foundation, rates high-value swords in four grades, and the highest grade Special Important Sword (Tokubetsu Juyo Token, 特別重要刀剣) is considered to be equivalent to the value of Important Art Object. Although swords owned by the Japanese imperial family are not designated as National Treasures or Important Cultural Properties because they are outside the jurisdiction of the Law for the Protection of Cultural Properties, there are many swords of the National Treasure class, and they are called "Gyobutsu" (御物).

Currently, there are several authoritative rating systems for swordsmiths. According to the rating approved by the Japanese government, from 1890 to 1947, two swordsmiths who were appointed as Imperial Household Artist and after 1955, six swordsmiths who were designated as Living National Treasure are regarded as the best swordsmiths. According to the rating approved by The Society for Preservation of Japanese Art Swords, a public interest incorporated foundation, 39 swordsmiths who were designated as Mukansa (無鑑査) since 1958 are considered to be the highest ranking swordsmiths. The best sword forged by Japanese swordsmiths is awarded the most honorable Masamune prize by The Society for Preservation of Japanese Art Swords. Since 1961, eight swordsmiths have received the Masamune Prize, and among them, three swordsmiths, Masamine Sumitani, Akitsugu Amata and Toshihira Osumi, have received the prize three times each and Sadakazu Gassan II has received the prize two times. These four people were designated both Living National Treasures and Mukansa.

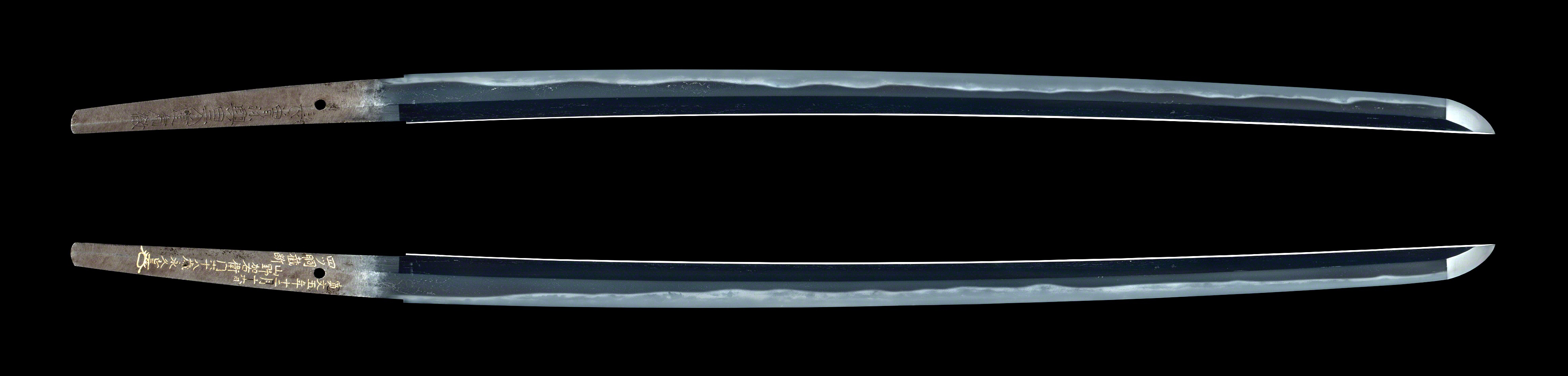
Katana forged by Nagasone Kotetsu. The letters inlaid with gold on the tang (nakago) indicated that Yamano Kauemon (山野加右衛門), the official executioner of the Tokugawa shogunate and examiner of sword cutting performance, cut the four human torso overlapped.

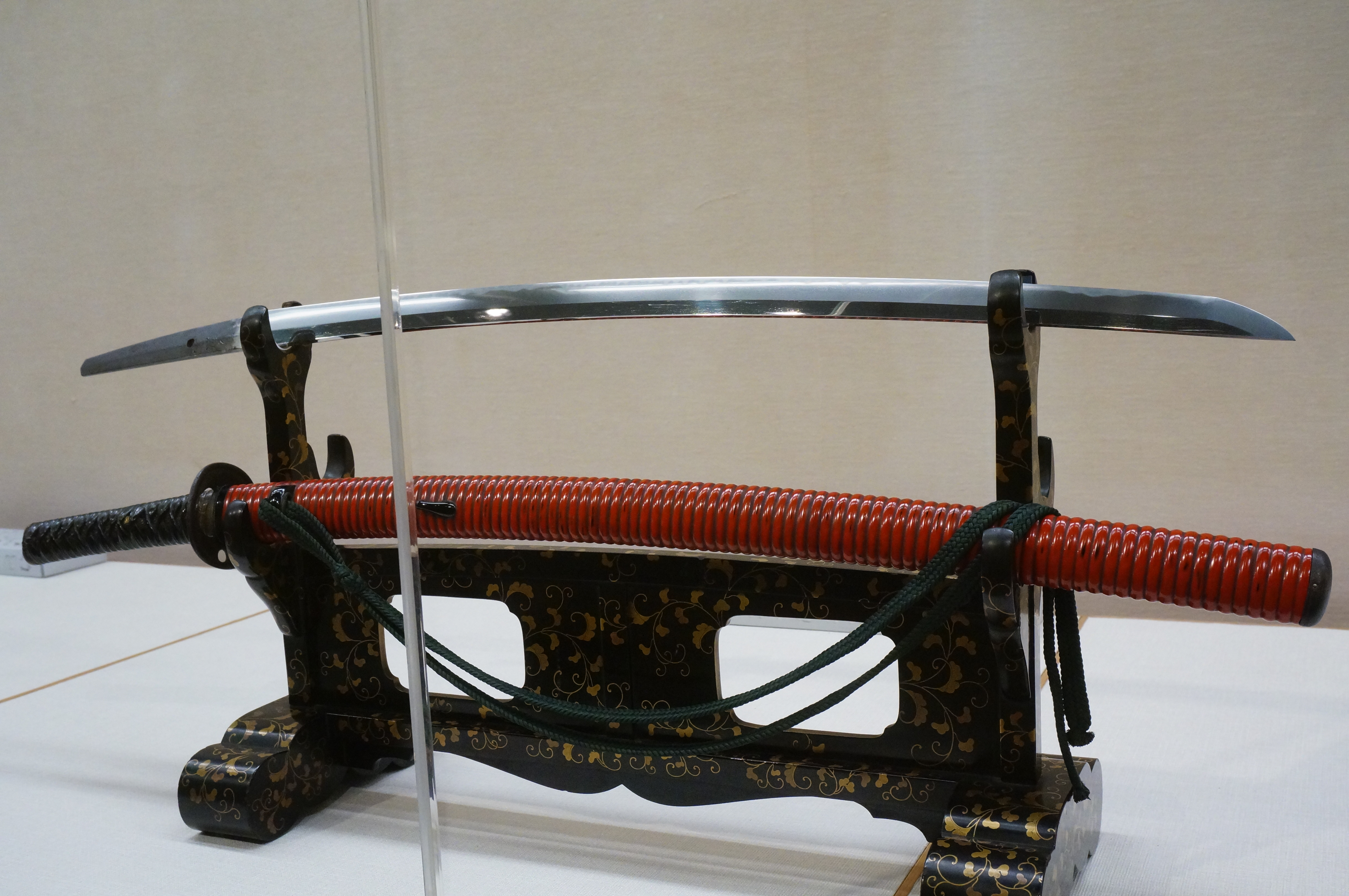
A katana forged by Magoroku Kanemoto. (Saijo Ō Wazamono) Late Muromachi period. (top) Katana mounting, Early Edo period. (bottom)

== Usage in martial arts ==
Katana were used by samurai both in the battlefield and for practicing several martial arts, and modern martial artists still use a variety of katana. Martial arts in which training with katana is used include aikidō, iaijutsu, battōjutsu, iaidō, kenjutsu, kendō, ninjutsu,Tenshin Shōden Katori Shintō-ryū and Shinkendo. However, for safety reasons, katana used for martial arts are usually blunt edged iaito or wooden bokken, to reduce the risk of injury. Sharp katana are only really used during tameshigiri (blade testing), where a practitioner practices cutting a bamboo or tatami straw post.

== Storage and maintenance ==
If mishandled in its storage or maintenance, the katana may become irreparably damaged. The blade should be stored horizontally in its sheath, curve down and edge facing upward to maintain the edge. It is extremely important that the blade remain well-oiled, powdered and polished, as the natural moisture residue from the hands of the user will rapidly cause the blade to rust if not cleaned off. The traditional oil used is chōji oil (99% mineral oil and 1% clove oil for fragrance). Similarly, when stored for longer periods, it is important that the katana be inspected frequently and aired out if necessary in order to prevent rust or mold from forming (mold may feed off the salts in the oil used to polish the blade).

== World records ==
Multiple sword world records were made with a katana and verified by Guinness World Records. Iaido master Isao Machii set the record for "Most martial arts katana cuts to one mat (suegiri)", "Fastest 1,000 martial arts sword cuts", "Most sword cuts to straw mats in three minutes", and "Fastest tennis ball (708km/h) cut by sword". There are various records for Tameshigiri. For example, the Greek Agisilaos Vesexidis set the record for most martial arts sword cuts in one minute (73) on 25 June 2016.

== Ownership and trade restrictions ==
=== Republic of Ireland ===
Under the Firearms and Offensive Weapons Act 1990 (Offensive Weapons) (Amendment) Order 2009, katanas made post-1953 are illegal unless made by hand according to traditional methods.

=== United Kingdom ===
As of April 2008, the British government added swords with a curved blade of 50 cm (20 in) or over in length ("the length of the blade shall be the straight line distance from the top of the handle to the tip of the blade") to the Offensive Weapons Order. This ban was a response to reports that samurai swords were used in more than 80 attacks and four killings over the preceding four years. Those who violate the ban would be jailed up to six months and charged a fine of £5,000. Martial arts practitioners, historical re-enactors and others may still own such swords. The sword can also be legal provided it was made in Japan before 1954, or was made using traditional sword making methods. It is also legal to buy if it can be classed as a "martial artist's weapon". This ban applies to England, Wales, Scotland and Northern Ireland. This ban was amended in August 2008 to allow sale and ownership without licence of "traditional" hand-forged katana.

== Gallery ==
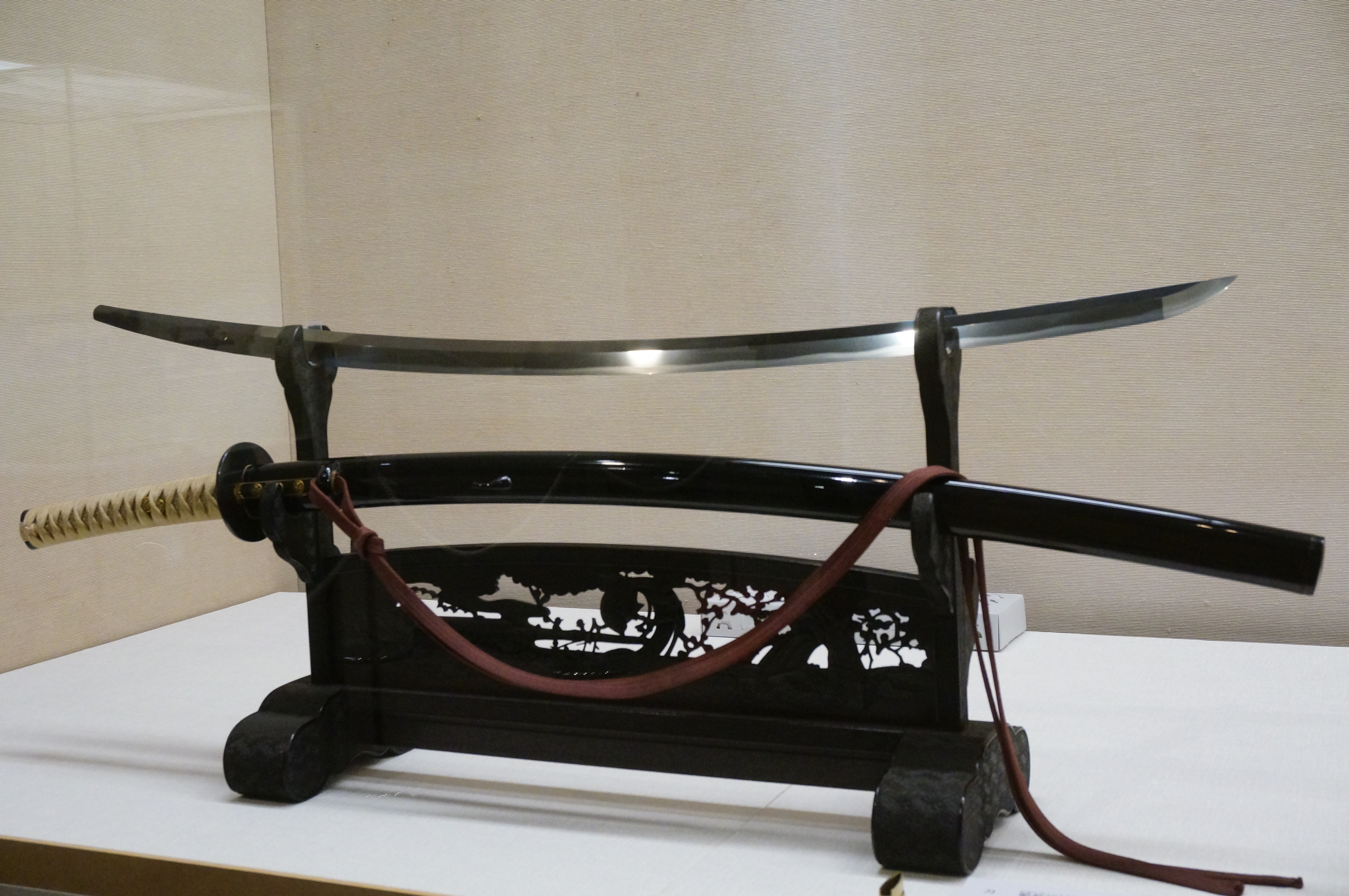
A katana forged by Hizen Tadayoshi I. (Saijo Ō Wazamono) Azuchi－Momoyama period. (top) Katana mounting, Late Edo period. (bottom)

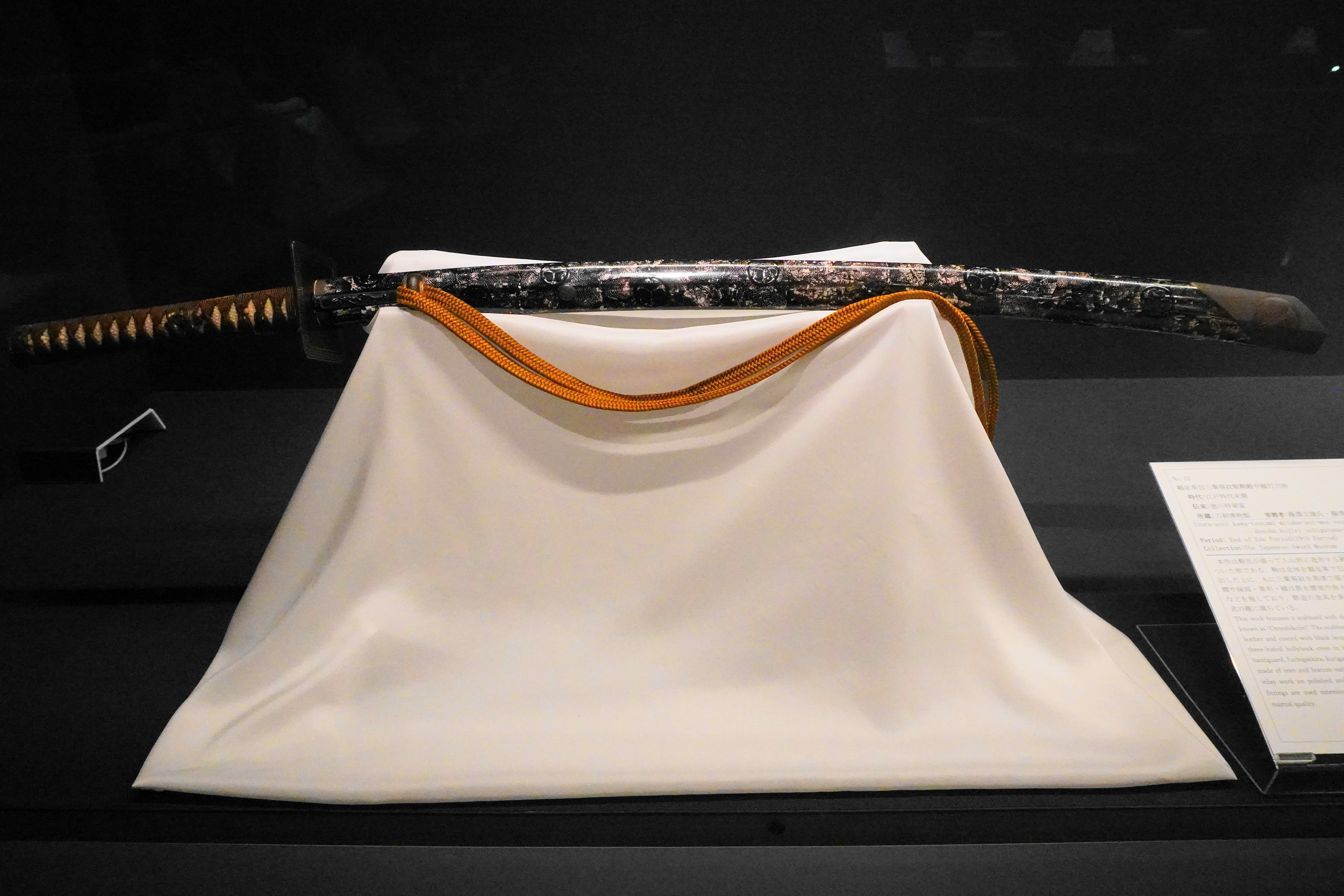
Katana mounting for Musashi Masamuneme, Edo period, The Japanese Sword Museum

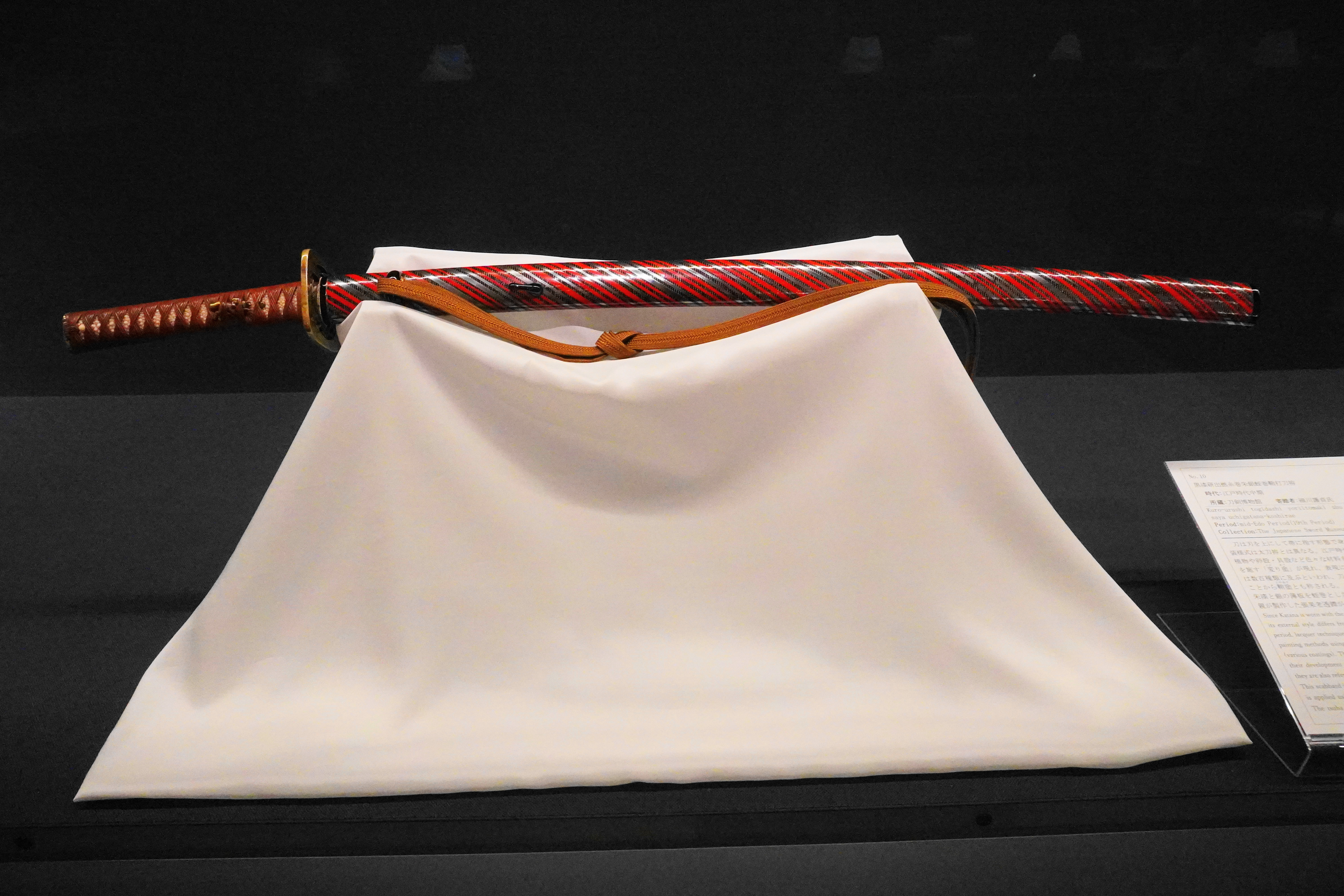
A hirumaki (leech patterned) katana mounting coated with vermilion lacquer and wrapped in a thin silver plate, Edo period, The Japanese Sword Museum

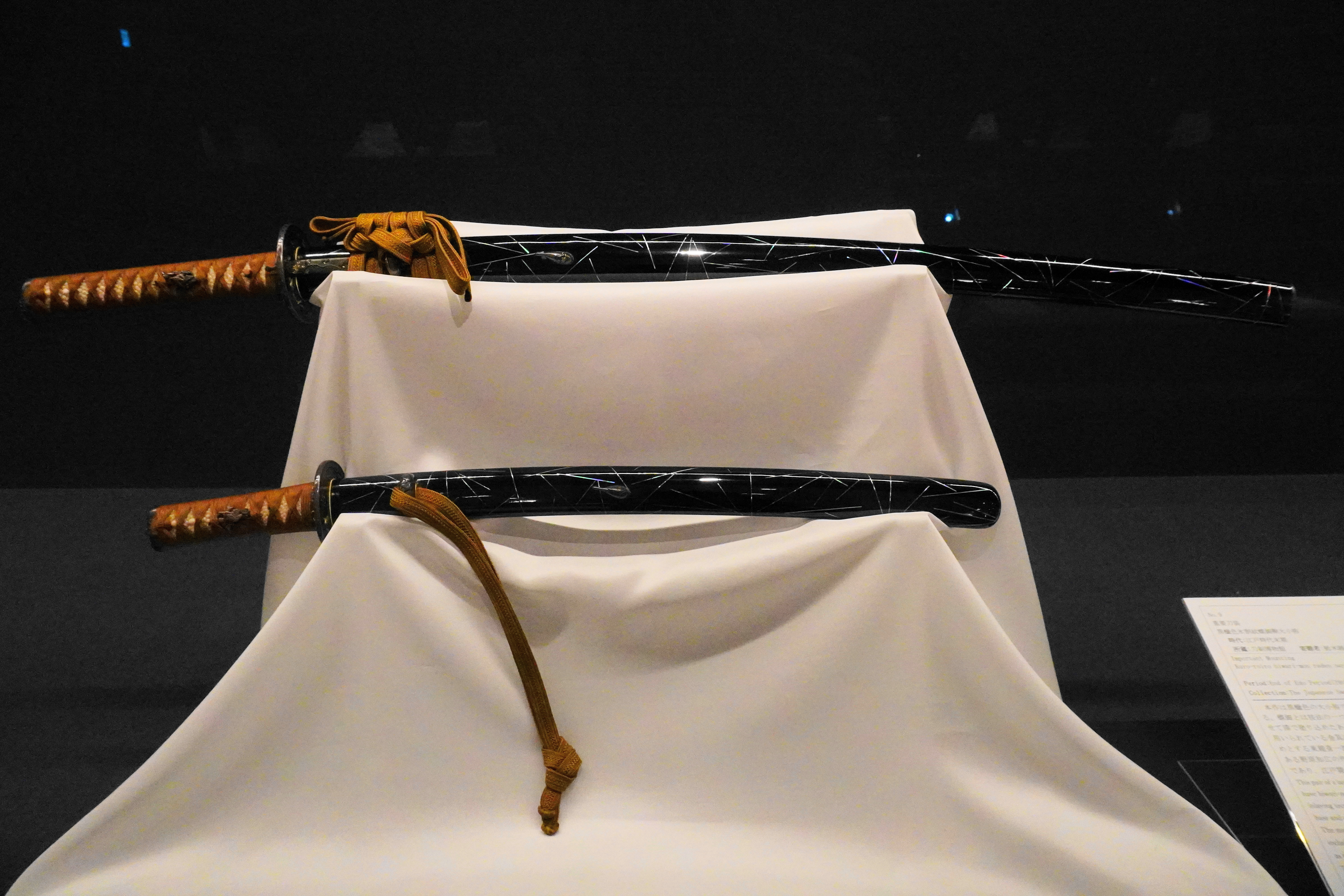
Katana (Daishō) mountings with ice crack pattern design. Edo period, Designated as Important Mounting, The Japanese Sword Museum

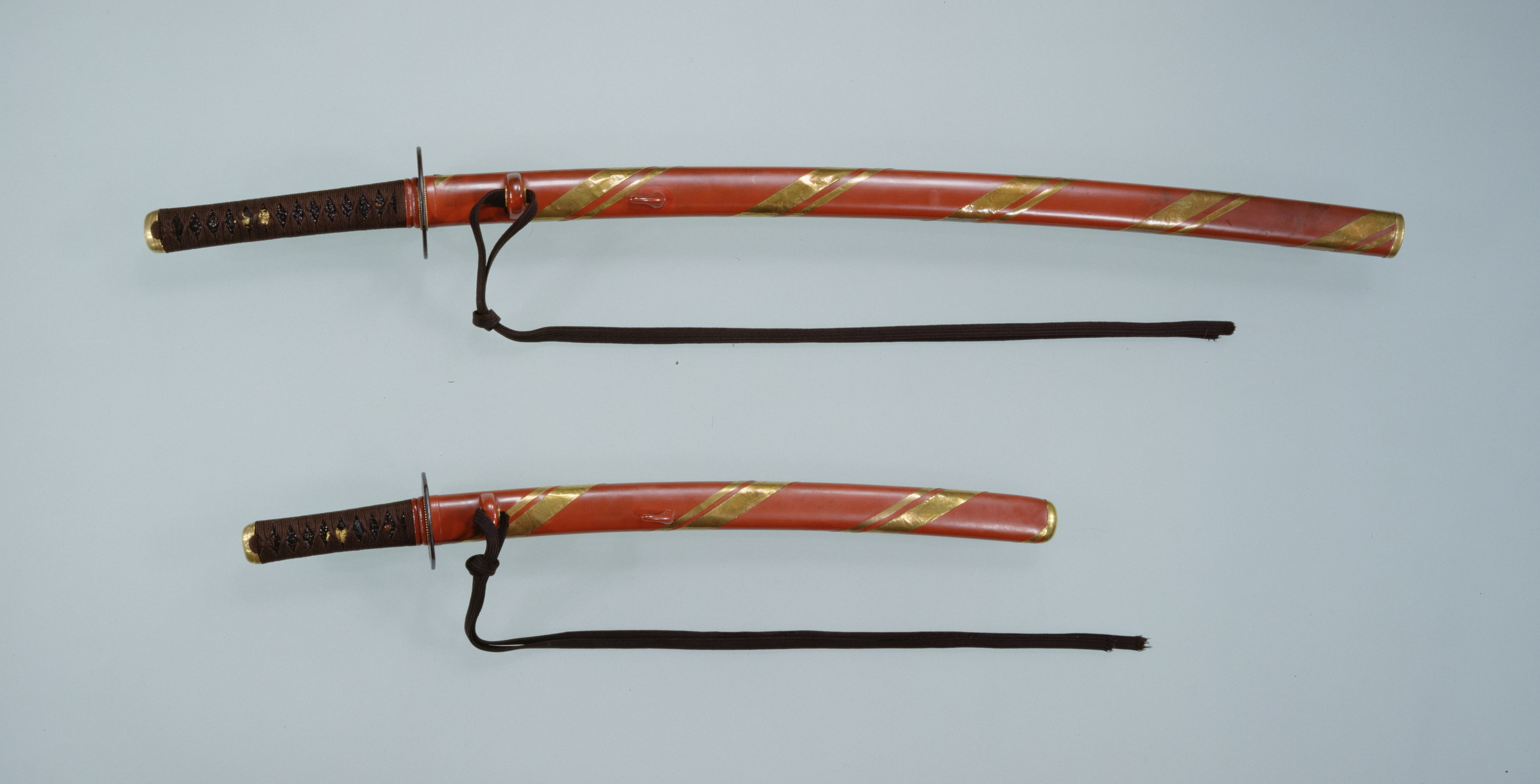
Daishō style sword mounting, gold banding on red-lacquered ground. 16th century, Azuchi–Momoyama period. Important Cultural Property. Tokyo National Museum. These swords were owned by Toyotomi Hideyoshi.

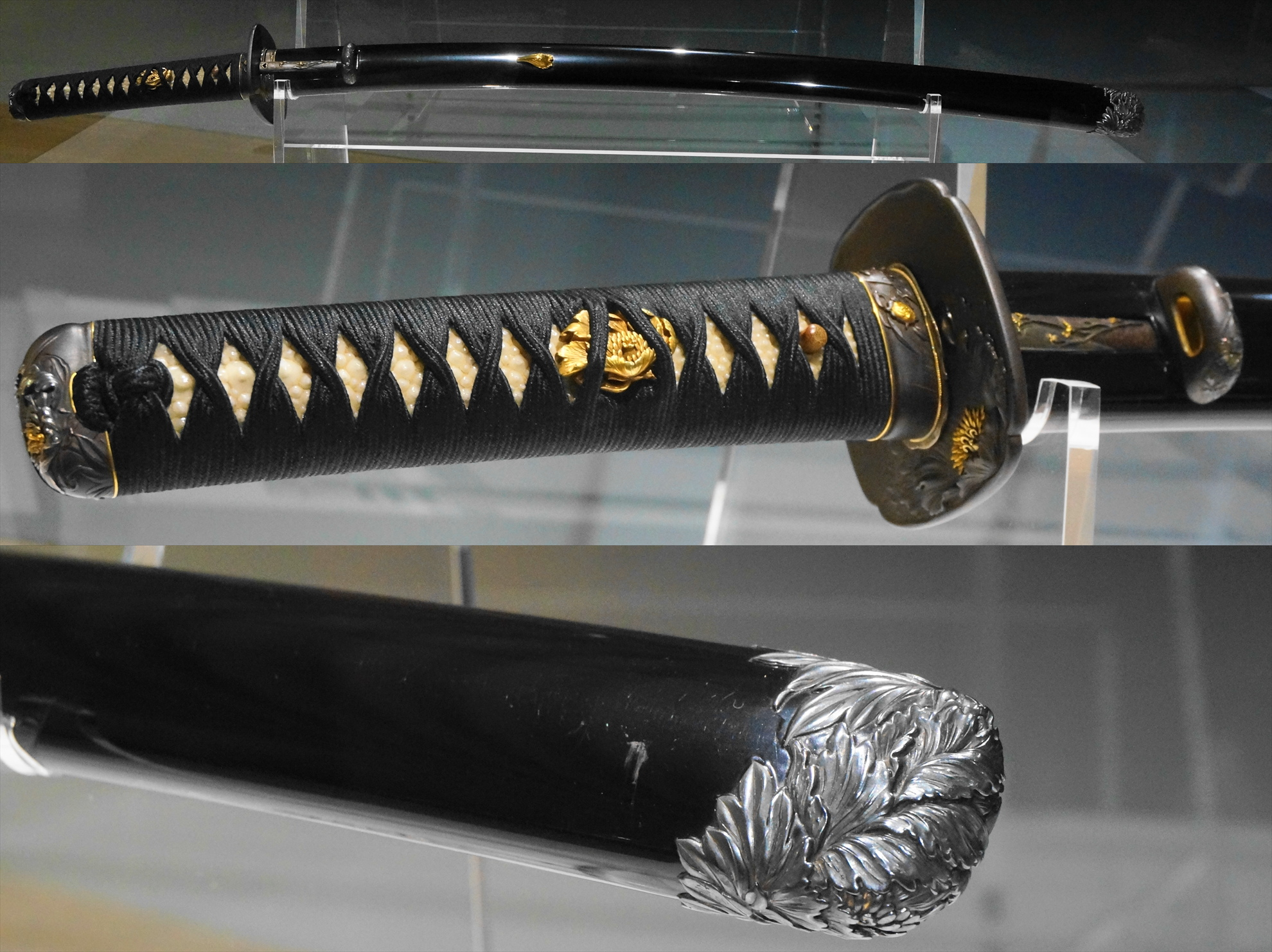
Katana mounting with a polished black lacquer sheath, Edo period. Museum of Fine Arts, Boston.

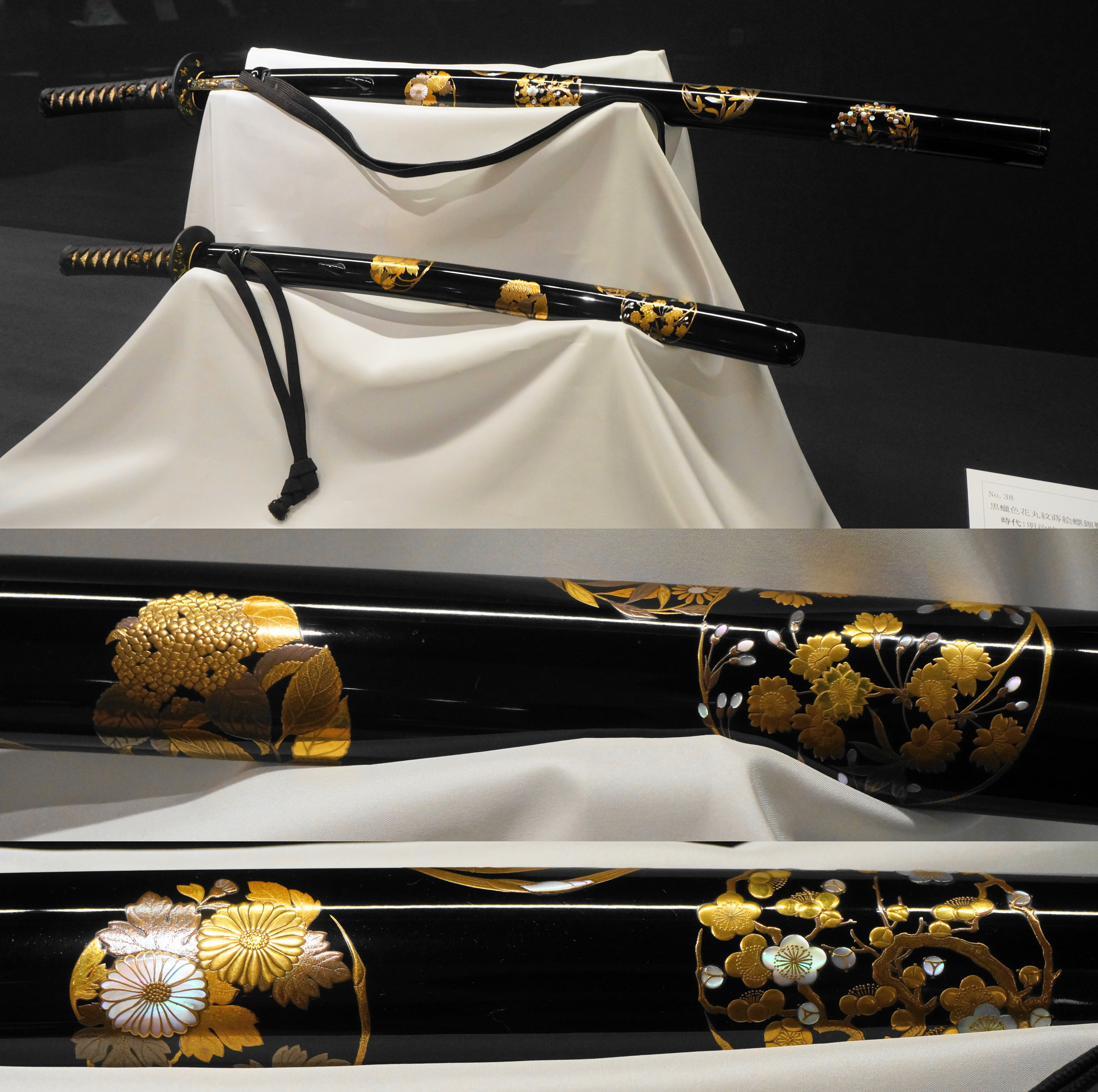
Black lacquered hanamaru mon maki-e raden daishō koshirae. Meiji period.

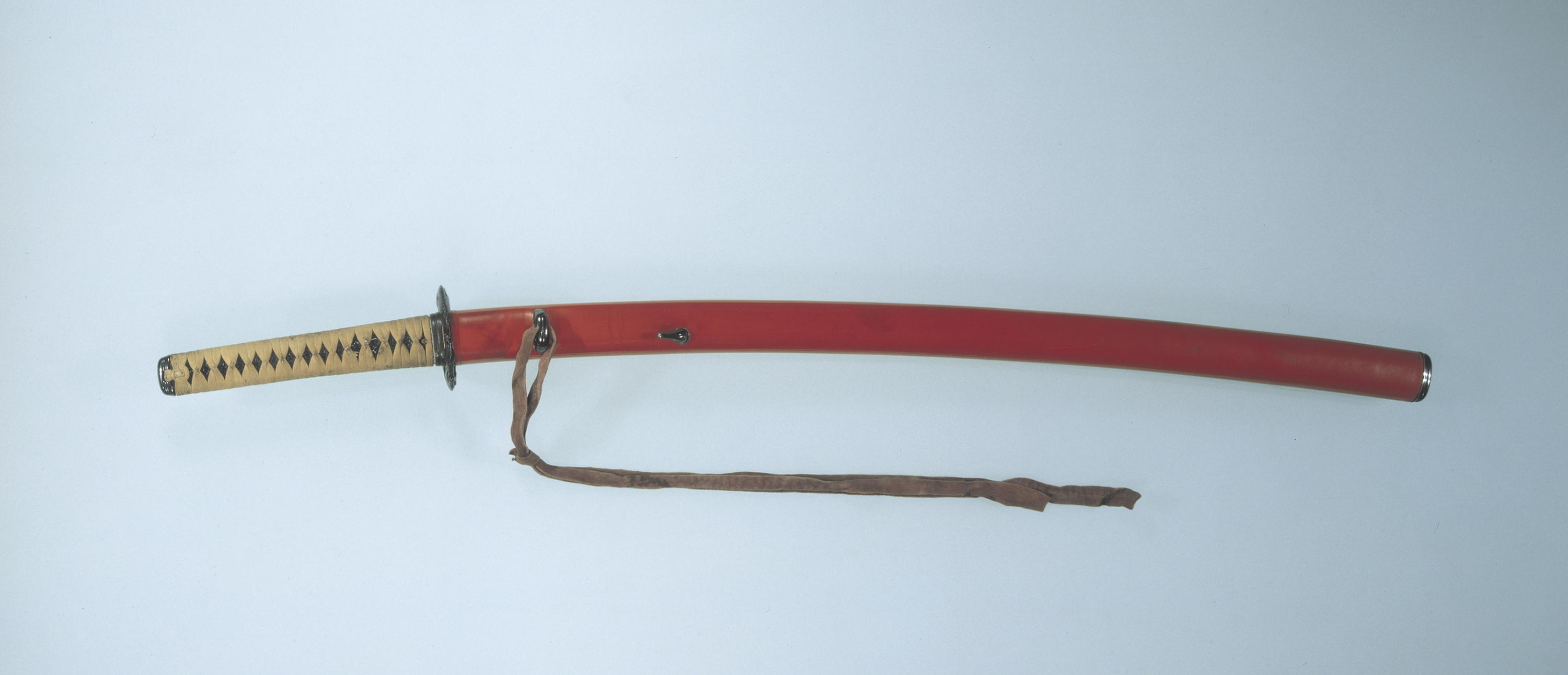
Mounting for a katana forged by Motoshige. late 16th or early 17th century, Azuchi–Momoyama or Edo period. Important Cultural Property. Tokyo National Museum.

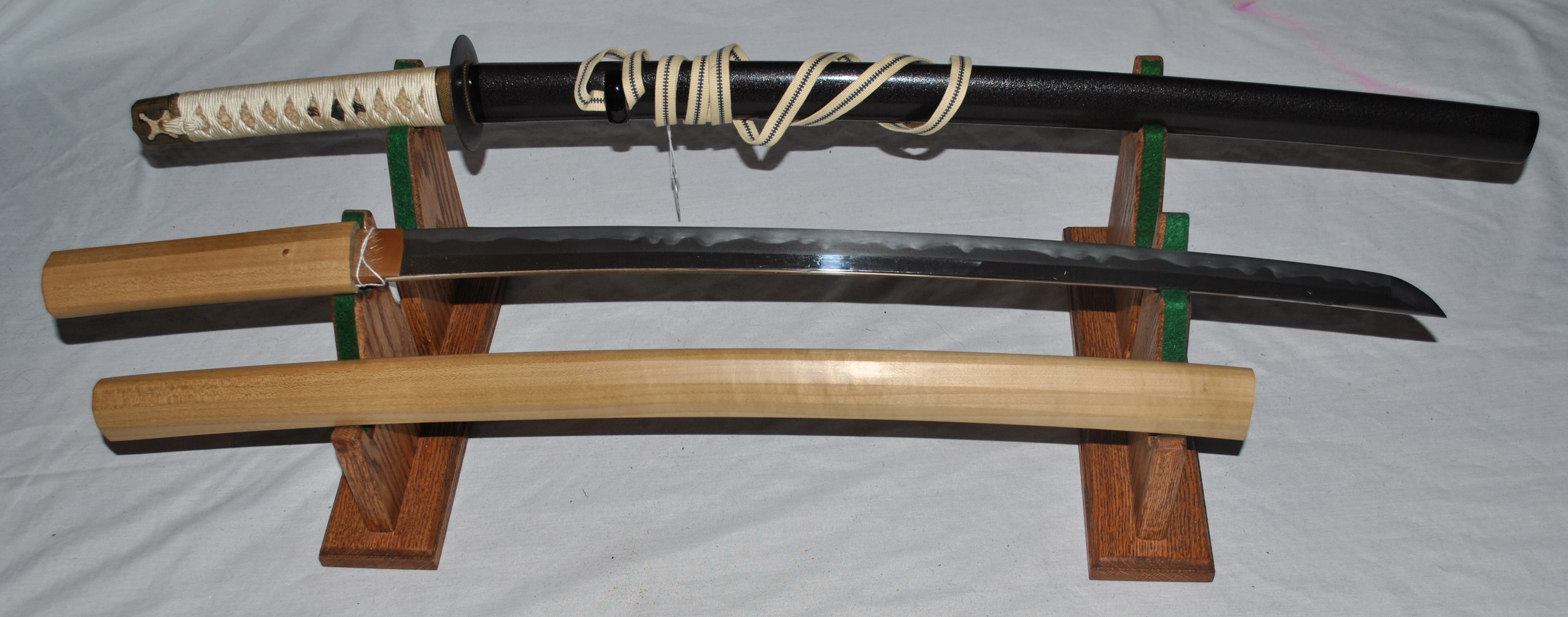
Antique Japanese katana with koshirae and shirasaya, attributed to Sukenao, 1600s

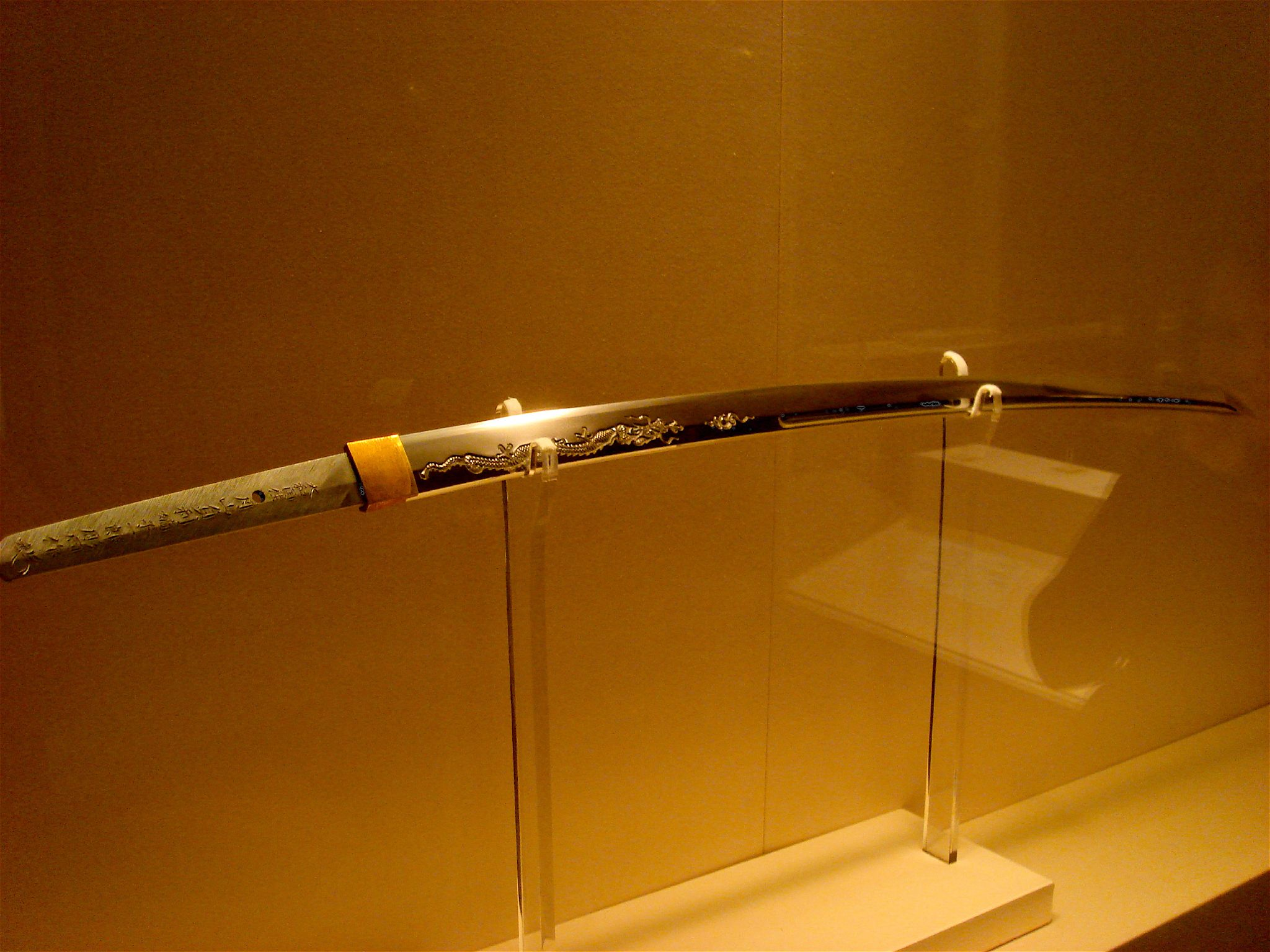
Japanese katana showing a horimono (blade carving), Metropolitan Museum of Art

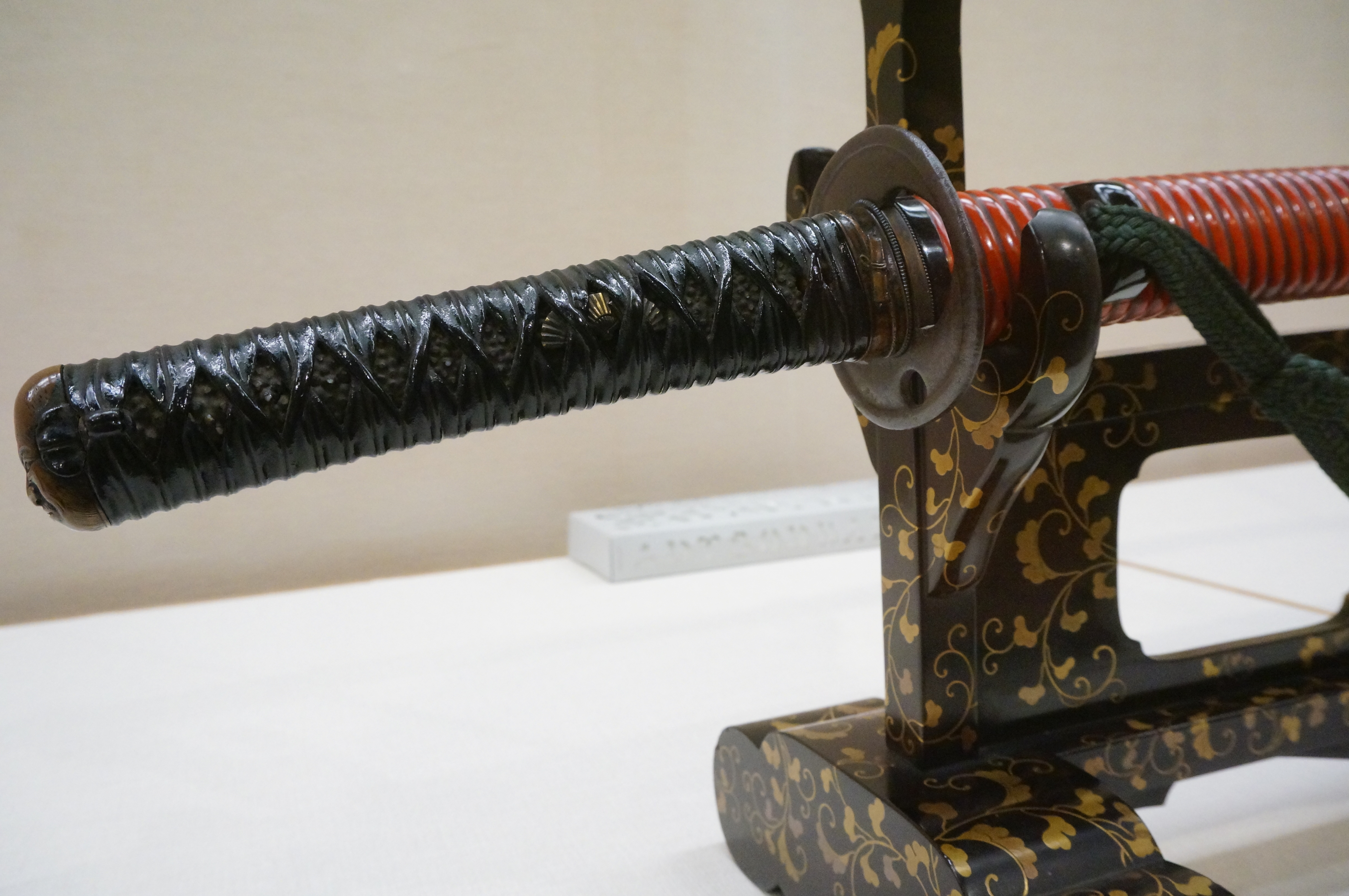
Hilt of katana. Early Edo period.

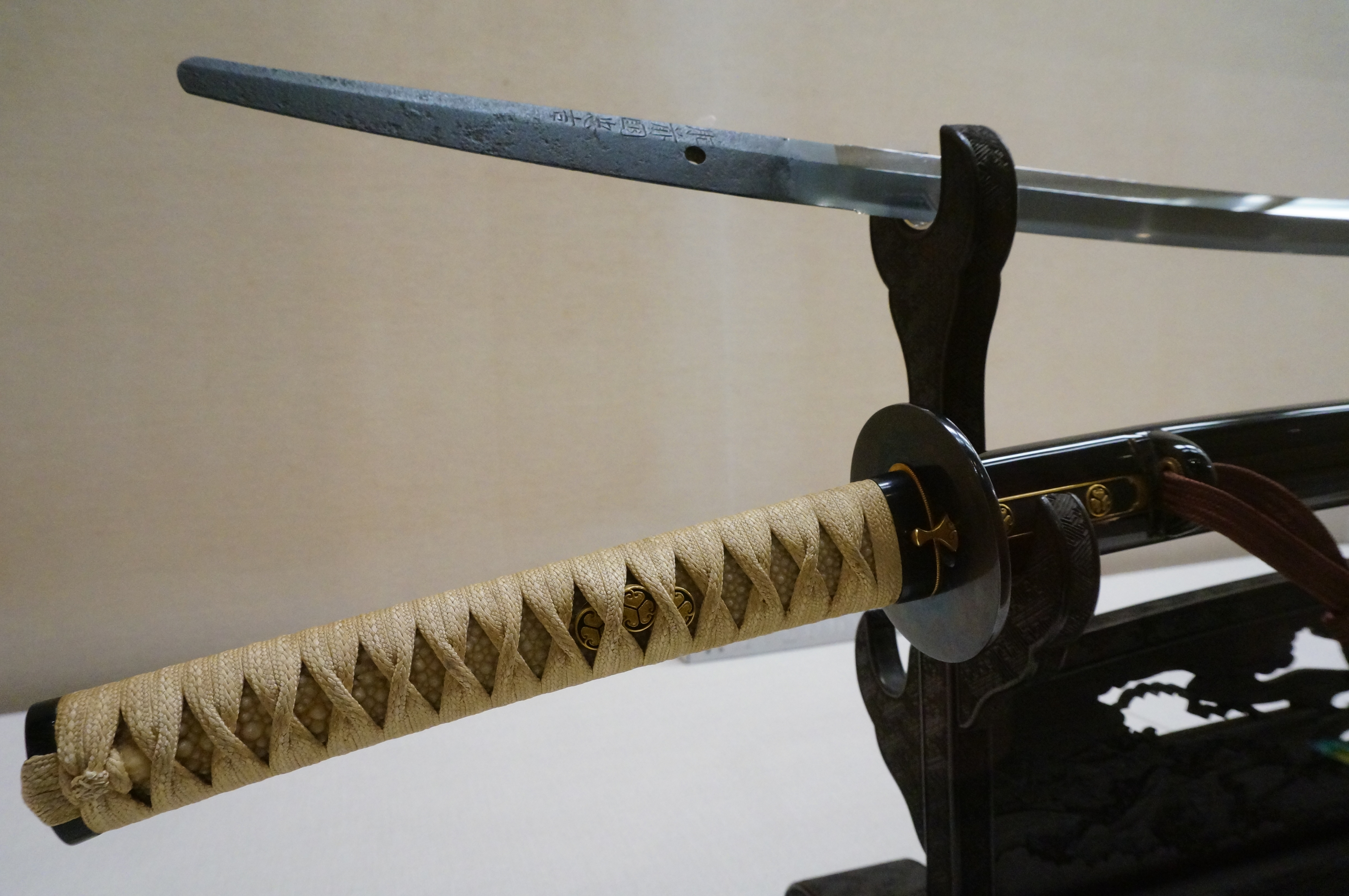
The inscription (mei) on the tang (nakago) of a katana forged by Hizen tadayoshi I, Azuchi－Momoyama period. (top) Hilt of katana. Late Edo period. (bottom)

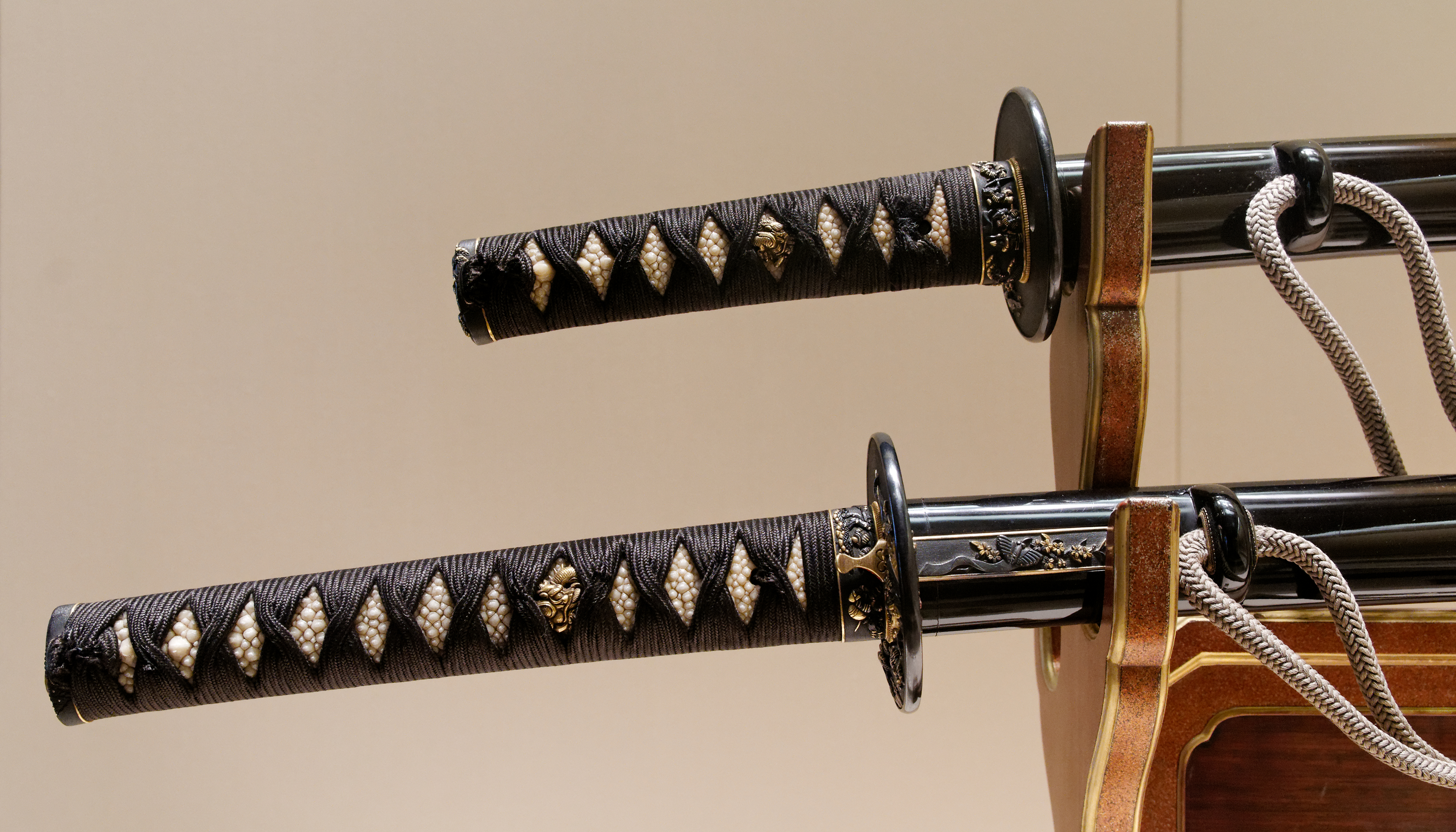
Koshirae (mountings) of an Edo period daishō, rayskin wrapped with silk

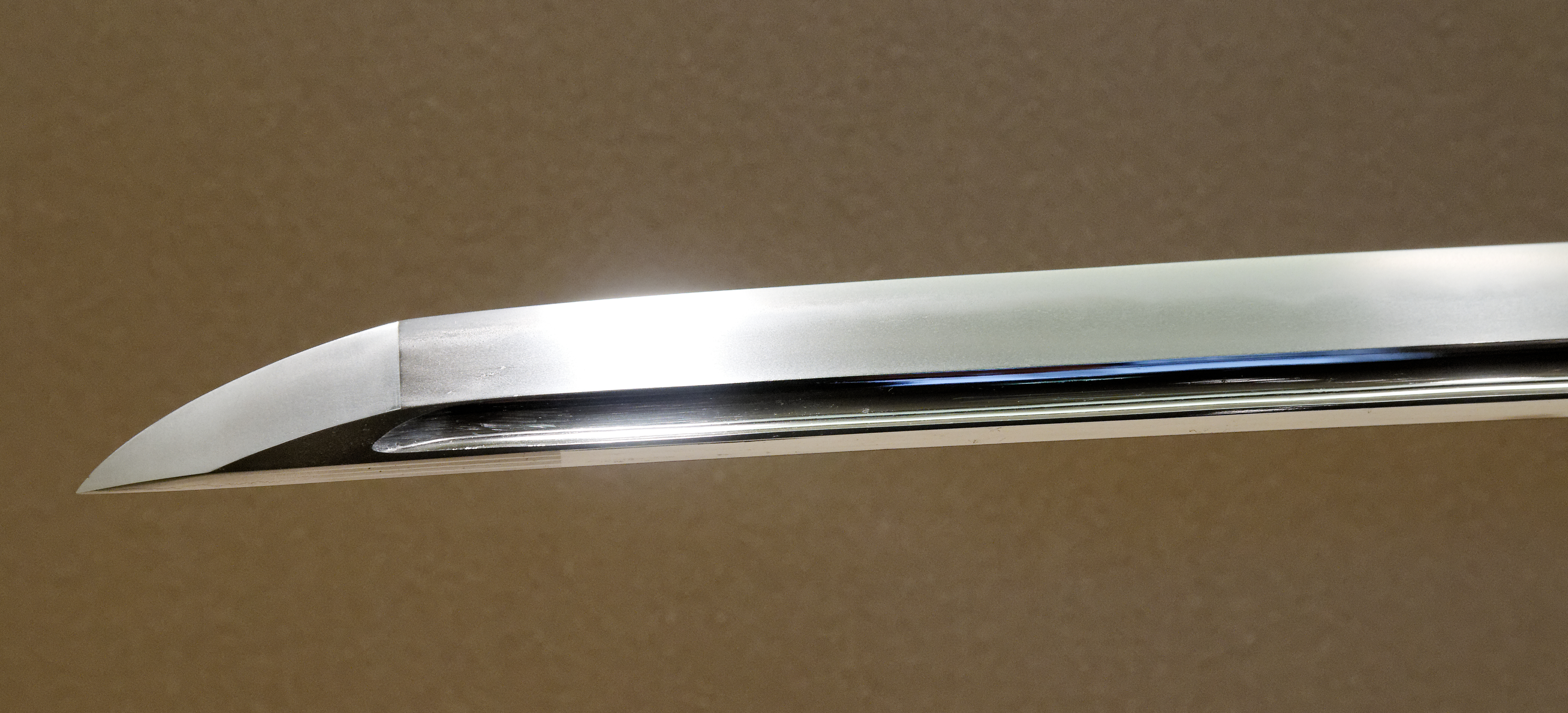
Kissaki (point) of an Edo period katana

== See also ==
- Backsword
- Broadsword
- Daishō
- Dha (sword)
- Hengdang
- Iaidō
- Japanese swordsmithing
- Japanese sword mountings
- Japanese sword
- Japanese swords in fiction
- Kenjutsu
- Korean sword
- Longsword
- Ōdachi
- Tachi
- Tenka-Goken ("Five Swords under Heaven") – five individual swords traditionally viewed as the best Japanese swords
- Wakizashi
- Wodao
