= Japanese swordsmithing =

Cultural forging process for bladed weapons

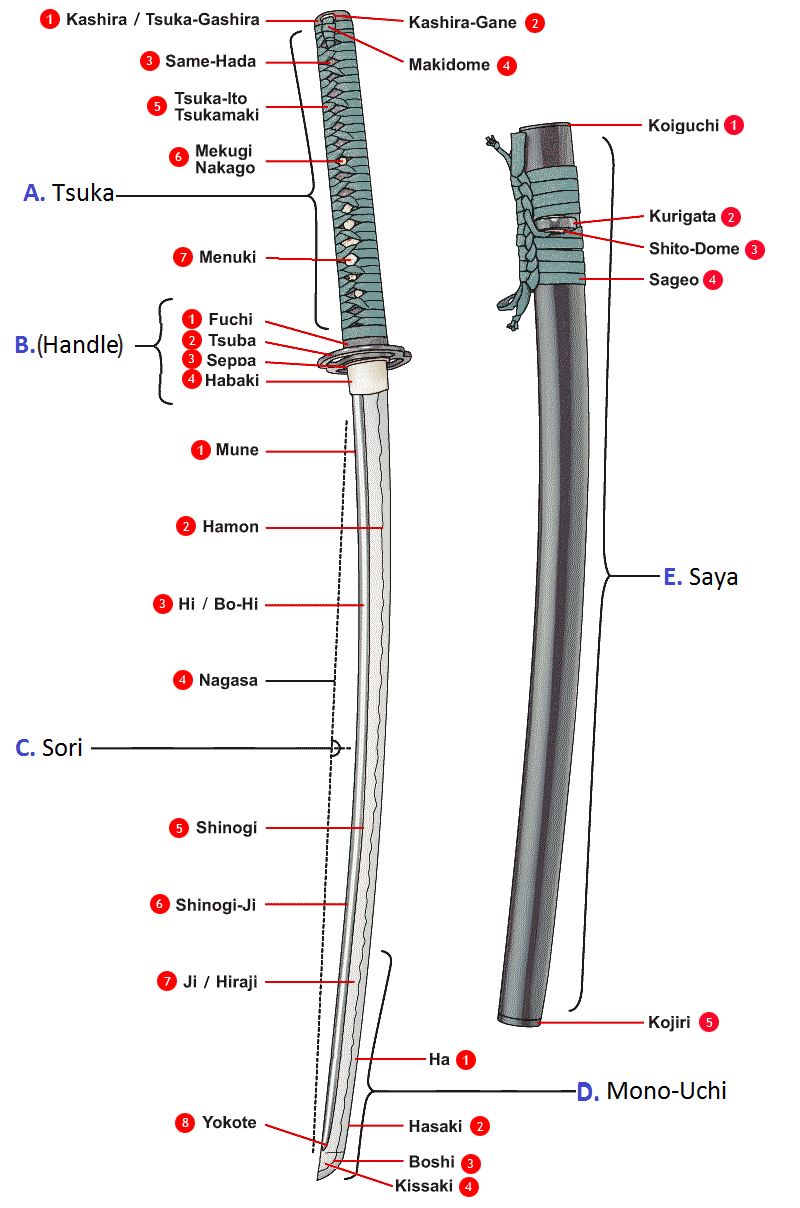
Visual glossary of Japanese sword terms

Japanese swordsmithing is the labour-intensive bladesmithing process developed in Japan beginning in the sixth century for forging traditionally made bladed weapons (nihonto) including katana, wakizashi, tantō, yari, naginata, nagamaki, tachi, nodachi, ōdachi, kodachi, and ya (arrow).

Japanese sword blades were often forged with different profiles, different blade thicknesses, and varying amounts of grind. Wakizashi and tantō were not simply scaled-down katana but were often forged without a ridge (hira-zukuri) or in other ways very seldom done on katana.

== Traditional methods ==
=== Steel production ===
The steel used in sword production is known as tamahagane (玉鋼:たまはがね), or "jewel steel" (tama – ball or jewel, hagane – steel). Tamahagane is produced from iron sand, a source of iron ore, and mainly used to make samurai swords, such as the katana, and some tools.

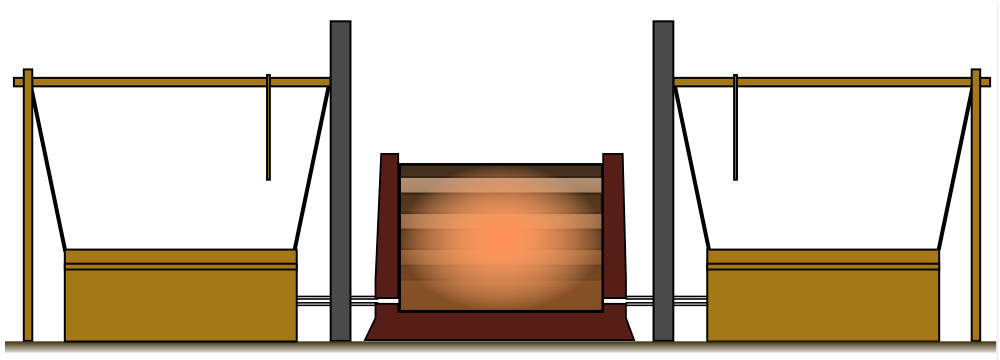
Diagram of a tatara and bellows

The smelting process used is different from the modern mass production of steel. A clay vessel about 1.1 m (3 ft 7 in) tall, 3 m (10 ft) long, and 1.1 m (3 ft 7 in) wide is constructed. This is known as a tatara. After the clay tub has set, it is fired until dry. A charcoal fire is started from soft pine charcoal. Then the smelter will wait for the fire to reach the correct temperature. At that point he will direct the addition of iron sand known as satetsu. This will be layered in with more charcoal and more iron sand over the next 72 hours. Four or five people are needed to constantly work on this process. It takes about a week to build the tatara and complete the iron conversion to steel. Because the charcoal cannot exceed the melting point of iron, the steel is not able to become fully molten, and this allows both high and low carbon material to be created and separated once cooled. When complete, the tatara is broken to remove the steel bloom, known as a kera. At the end of the process the tatara will have consumed about 9.1 t (9.0 long tons; 10.0 short tons) of satetsu and 11 t (11 long tons; 12 short tons) of charcoal leaving about 2.3 t (2.3 long tons; 2.5 short tons) of kera, from which less than a ton of tamahagane can be produced. A single kera batch can typically be worth hundreds of thousands of dollars, making it many times more expensive than modern steels.

Japanese tatara steelmaking process using ironsand started in Kibi Province in the sixth century and spread throughout Japan, using a unique Japanese low box-shaped furnace different from the Chinese and Korean styles. From the Middle Ages, as the size of furnaces became larger and the underground structure became more complicated, it became possible to produce a large amount of steel of higher quality, and in the Edo period, the underground structure, the blowing method, and the building were further improved to complete tatara steelmaking process using the same method as modern tatara steelmaking. With the introduction of Western steelmaking technology in the Meiji period, tatara steelmaking declined and stopped for a while in the Taisho period, but in 1977 The Society for Preservation of Japanese Art Swords restored tatara steelmaking in the Shōwa era and new tamahagane refined by tatara steelmaking became available for making Japanese swords.

Currently, tamahagane is only made three or four times a year by The Society for Preservation of Japanese Art Swords and Hitachi Metals during winter in a wood building and is only sold to master swordsmiths.

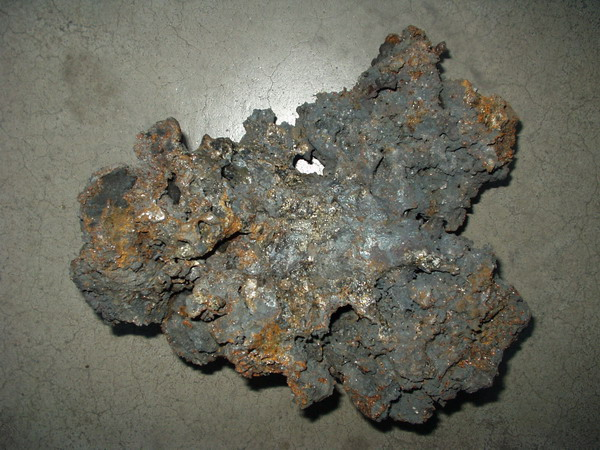
Tamahagane

=== Construction ===
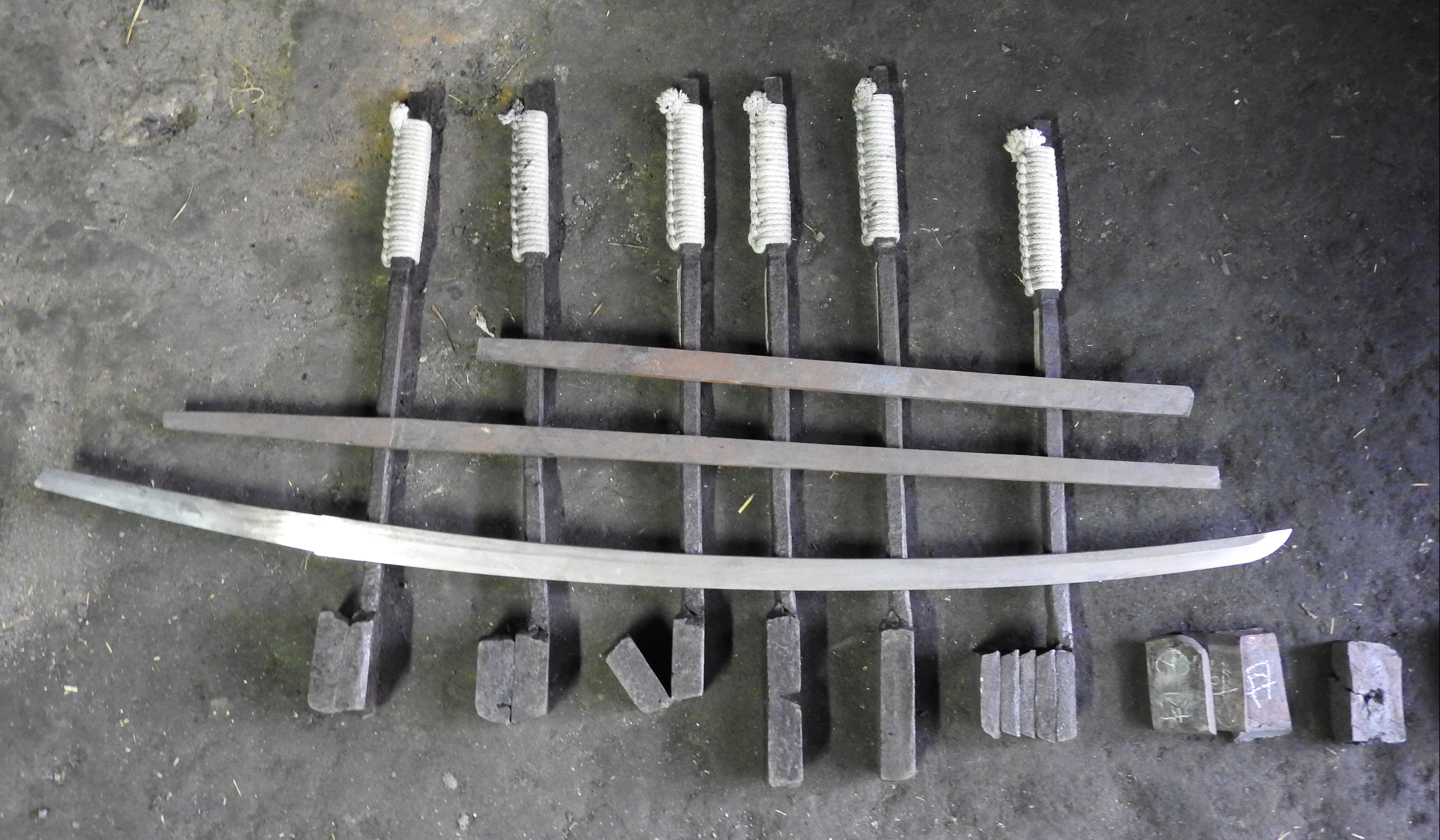
The different steps

The forging of a Japanese blade typically took many days or weeks and was considered a sacred art, traditionally accompanied by a large panoply of Shinto religious rituals. As with many complex endeavors, several artists were involved. There was a smith to forge the rough shape, often a second smith (apprentice) to fold the metal, a specialist polisher, and even a specialist for the edge. Often, there were sheath, hilt, and handguard specialists as well.

==== Forging ====
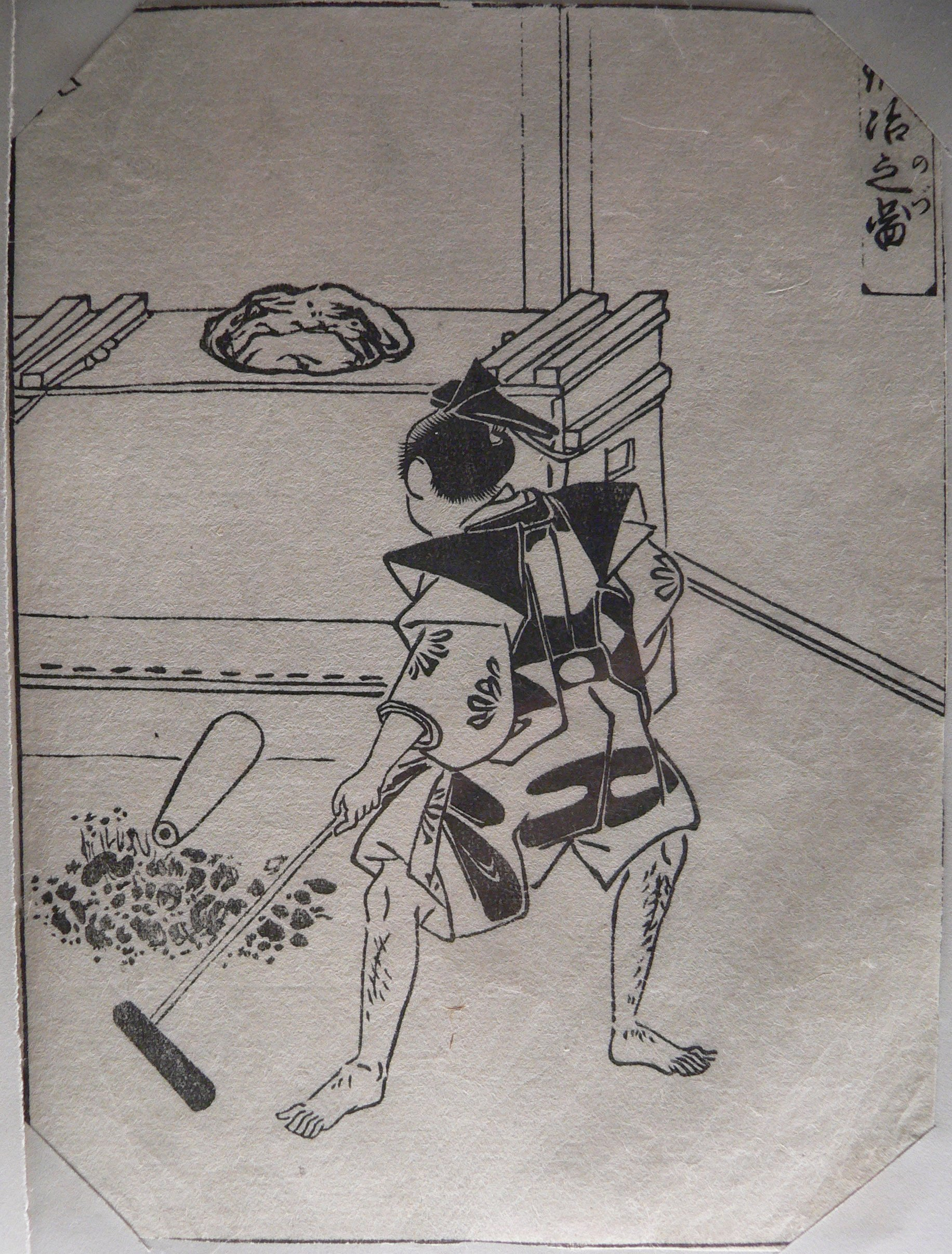
Forge scenes, print from a book from the Edo period (1603–1867), Museum of Ethnography of Neuchâtel

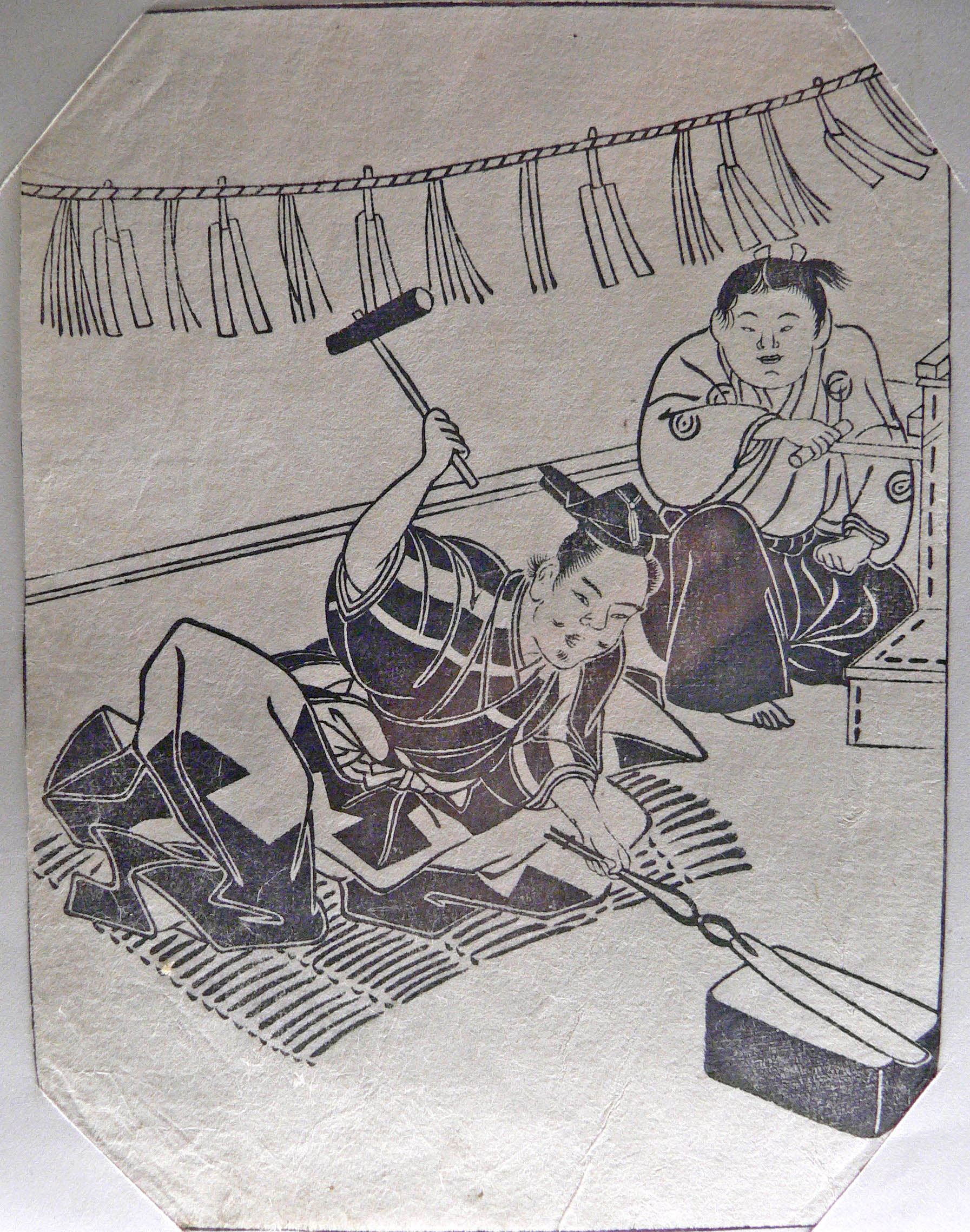
Blacksmith scene, print from an Edo period book, Museum of Ethnography of Neuchâtel

The steel bloom, or kera, that is produced in the tatara contains steel that varies greatly in carbon content, ranging from wrought iron to pig iron. Three types of steel are chosen for the blade; a very low-carbon steel called hocho-tetsu is used for the core of the blade (shingane). The high-carbon steel (tamahagane), and the remelted pig iron (cast iron or nabe-gane), are combined to form the outer skin of the blade (kawagane). Only about 1/3 of the kera produces steel that is suitable for sword production.

The best known part of the manufacturing process is the folding of the steel, where the swords are made by repeatedly heating, hammering and folding the metal. The process of folding metal to improve strength and remove impurities is frequently attributed to specific Japanese smiths in legends. The folding removes impurities and helps even out the carbon content, while the alternating layers combine hardness with ductility to greatly enhance the toughness.

In traditional Japanese sword making, the low-carbon iron is folded several times by itself, to purify it. This produces the soft metal to be used for the core of the blade. The high-carbon steel and the higher-carbon cast-iron are then forged in alternating layers. The cast-iron is heated, quenched in water, and then broken into small pieces to help free it from slag. The steel is then forged into a single plate, and the pieces of cast-iron are piled on top, and the whole thing is forge welded into a single billet, which is called the age-kitae process. The billet is then elongated, cut, folded, and forge welded again. The steel can be folded transversely (from front to back), or longitudinally (from side to side). Often both folding directions are used to produce the desired grain pattern. This process, called the shita-kitae, is repeated from 8 to as many as 16 times. After 20 foldings (2^{20}, or 1,048,576 individual layers), there is too much diffusion in the carbon content. The steel becomes almost homogeneous in this respect, and the act of folding no longer gives any benefit to the steel. Depending on the amount of carbon introduced, this process forms either the very hard steel for the edge (hagane) or the slightly less hardenable spring steel (kawagane) which is often used for the sides and the back.

During the last few foldings, the steel may be forged into several thin plates, stacked, and forge welded into a brick. The grain of the steel is carefully positioned between adjacent layers, with the configuration dependent on the part of the blade for which the steel will be used.

Between each heating and folding, the steel is coated in a mixture of clay, water and straw-ash to protect it from oxidation and carburization. This clay provides a highly reducing environment. At around 1,650 °F (900 °C), the heat and water from the clay promote the formation of a wustite layer, which is a type of iron oxide formed in the absence of oxygen. In this reducing environment, the silicon in the clay reacts with wustite to form fayalite and, at around 2,190 °F (1,200 °C), the fayalite becomes a liquid. This liquid acts as a flux, attracting impurities, and pulls out the impurities as it is squeezed from between the layers. This leaves a very pure surface which, in turn, helps facilitate the forge-welding process. Through the loss of impurities, slag, and iron in the form of sparks during the hammering, by the end of forging the steel may be reduced to as little as 1/10 of its initial weight. This practice became popular because of the use of highly impure metals, stemming from the low temperature yielded in the smelting process. The folding did several things:

- It provided alternating layers of differing hardness. During quenching, the high carbon layers achieve greater hardness than the medium carbon layers. The hardness of the high-carbon steels combine with the ductility of the low-carbon steels to form the property of toughness.
- It eliminated any voids in the metal.
- It homogenized the metal within the layers, spreading the elements (such as carbon) evenly throughout the individual layers, increasing the effective strength by decreasing the number of potential weak points. Mathematically, the process by which the metal is homogenized through the folding is given by the baker's map.
- It burned off many impurities, helping to overcome the poor quality of the raw steel.
- It created up to 65,000 layers, by continuously decarburizing the surface and bringing it into the blade's interior, which gives the swords their grain (for comparison see pattern welding).

Generally, swords were created with the grain of the blade (hada) running down the blade like the grain on a plank of wood. Straight grains were called masame-hada, wood-like grain itame, wood-burl grain mokume, and concentric wavy grain (an uncommon feature seen almost exclusively in the Gassan school) ayasugi-hada. The difference between the first three grains is that of cutting a tree along the grain, at an angle, and perpendicular to its direction of growth (mokume-gane) respectively, the angle causing the "stretched" pattern.

==== Assembly ====
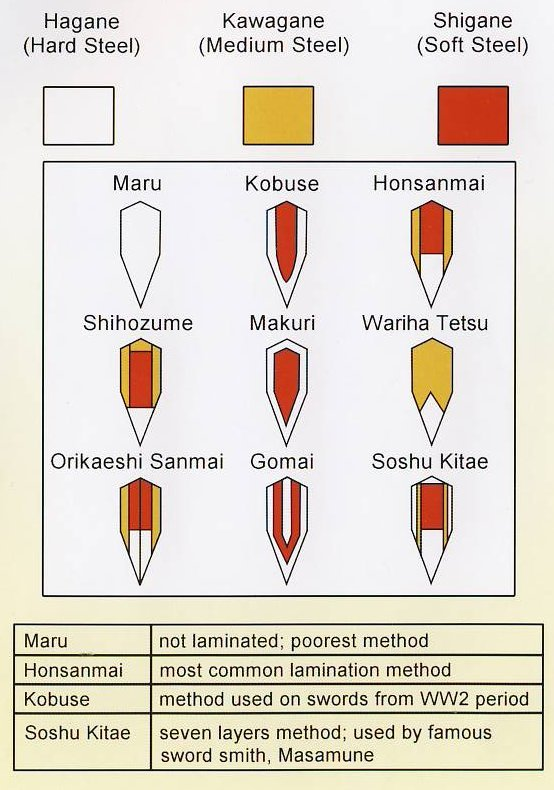

In addition to folding the steel, high quality Japanese swords are also composed of various distinct sections of different types of steel. This manufacturing technique uses different types of steel in different parts of the sword to accentuate the desired characteristics in various parts of the sword beyond the level offered by differential heat treatment.

The vast majority of modern katana and wakizashi are the maru type (sometimes also called muku) which is the most basic, with the entire sword being composed of a single steel. However, with the use of modern steels, this does not cause the sword to be fragile, as in former days. The kobuse type is made using two steels, which are called hagane (edge steel) and shingane (core steel). Honsanmai and shihozume types add the third steel, called kawagane (skin steel). The many different ways in which a sword can be assembled varies from smith to smith. Sometimes the edge-steel is "drawn out" (hammered into a bar), bent into a U-shaped trough, and the very soft core steel is inserted into the harder piece. Then they are forge welded together and hammered into the basic shape of the sword. By the end of the process, the two pieces of steel are fused together but retain their differences in hardness. The more complex types of construction are typically only found in antique weapons, with the vast majority of modern weapons being composed of a single section, or at most two or three sections.

Another way is to assemble the different pieces into a block, forge weld it together, and then draw out the steel into a sword so that the correct steel ends up in the desired place. This method is often used for the complex models, which allow for parrying without fear of damaging the side of the blade. To make honsanmai or shihozume types, pieces of hard steel are added to the outside of the blade in a similar fashion. The shihozume and soshu types are quite rare but added a rear support.

==== Geometry (shape and form) ====
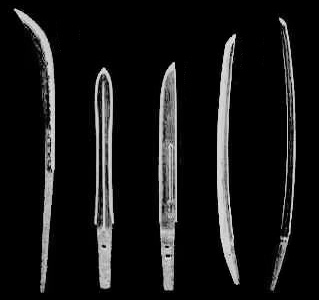
A range of Japanese blade types, from left to right: Naginata, Tsurugi or ken, Tantō, Katana and Tachi

The mainstream of the swords from the Kofun period to the Nara period was the straight single-edged sword called chokutō, and the swords of Japanese original style and Chinese style were mixed. The cross-sectional shape of the Japanese sword was an isosceles triangular hira-zukuri, and a sword with a cross-sectional shape called kiriha-zukuri, with only the cutting edge side of a planar blade sharpened at an acute angle, gradually appeared. The swords until this period are called jōkotō, and are often called separately from Japanese swords.

The predecessor of the Japanese sword has been called Warabitetō (ja:蕨手刀). In the middle of the Heian period (794–1185), samurai improved on the Warabitetō to develop Kenukigata-tachi (ja:毛抜形太刀) -early Japanese sword-. Kenukigata-tachi, which was developed in the first half of the 10th century, has a three-dimensional cross-sectional shape of an elongated pentagonal or hexagonal blade called shinogi-zukuri and a gently curved single-edged blade, which are typical features of Japanese swords. When a shinogi-zukuri sword is viewed from the side, there is a ridge line of the thickest part of the blade called shinogi between the cutting edge side and the back side. This shinogi contributes to lightening and toughening of the blade and high cutting ability. There is no wooden hilt attached to kenukigata-tachi, and the tang (nakago) which is integrated with the blade is directly gripped and used. The term kenukigata is derived from the fact that the central part of tang is hollowed out in the shape of a tool to pluck hair (kenuki).

In the tachi developed after kenukigata-tachi, a structure in which the hilt is fixed to the tang (nakago) with a pin called mekugi was adopted. As a result, a sword with three basic external elements of Japanese swords, the cross-sectional shape of shinogi-zukuri, a gently curved single-edged blade, and the structure of nakago, was completed.

In the Muromachi period, battles were mostly fought on foot, and the samurai equipped with swords changed from the tachi to the light katana because many mobilized peasants were armed with spears and matchlock guns. In general, katana has a cross-sectional shape of shinogizukuri, similar to tachi, but it is shorter than tachi and its blade curve is gentle.

Wakizashi and tantō are shorter swords than tachi and katana, and these swords are often forged in the cross-sectional shape of hira-zukuri or kiriha-zukuri.

==== Heat treating ====
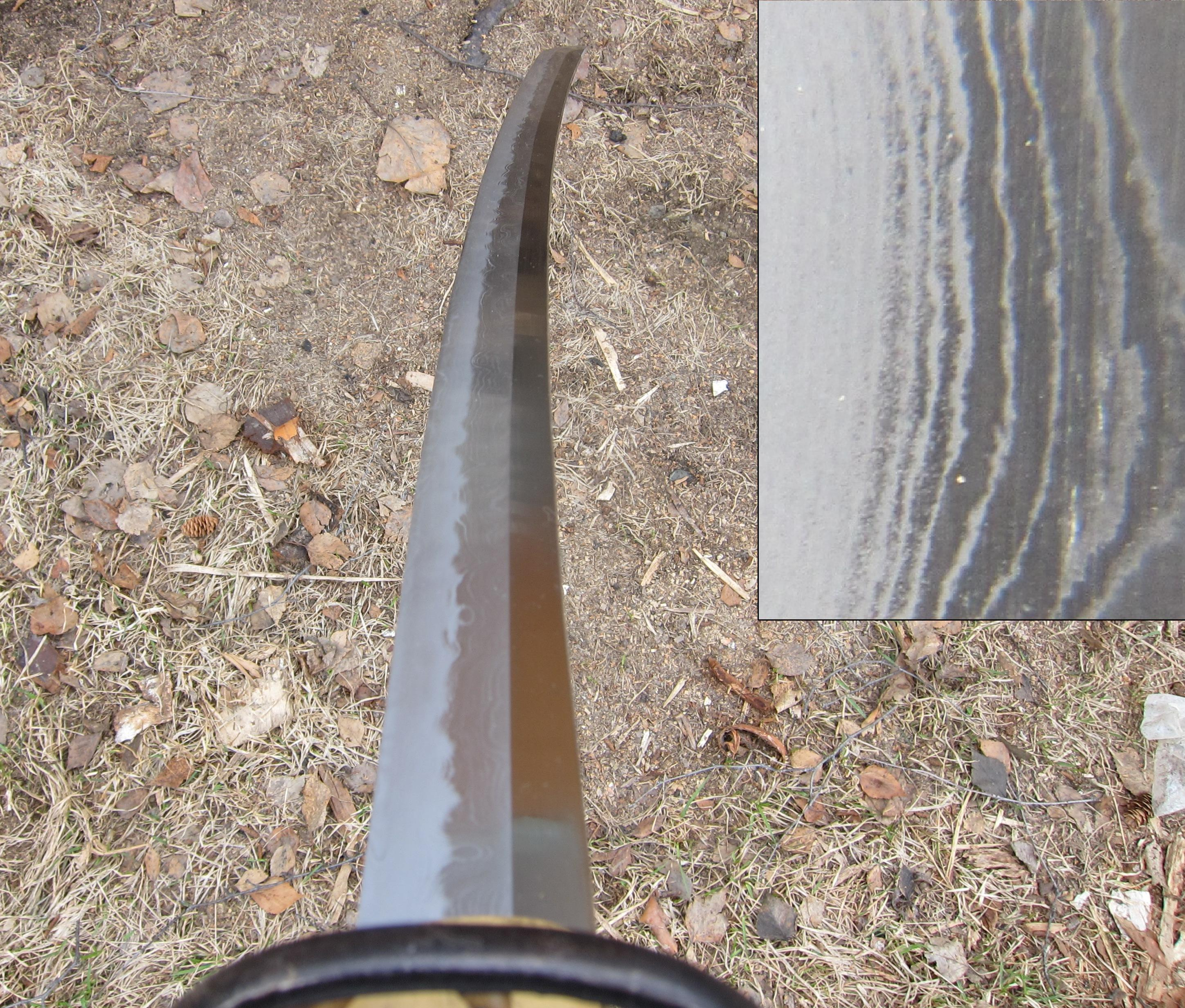
A katana, shown at a long angle to reveal the nioi, which is the bright, wavy line following the hamon. The inset shows a close-up of the nioi, appearing as the speckled area beside the bright hardened-edge. The nioi is made up of niye, which are single martensite crystals surrounded by darker pearlite.

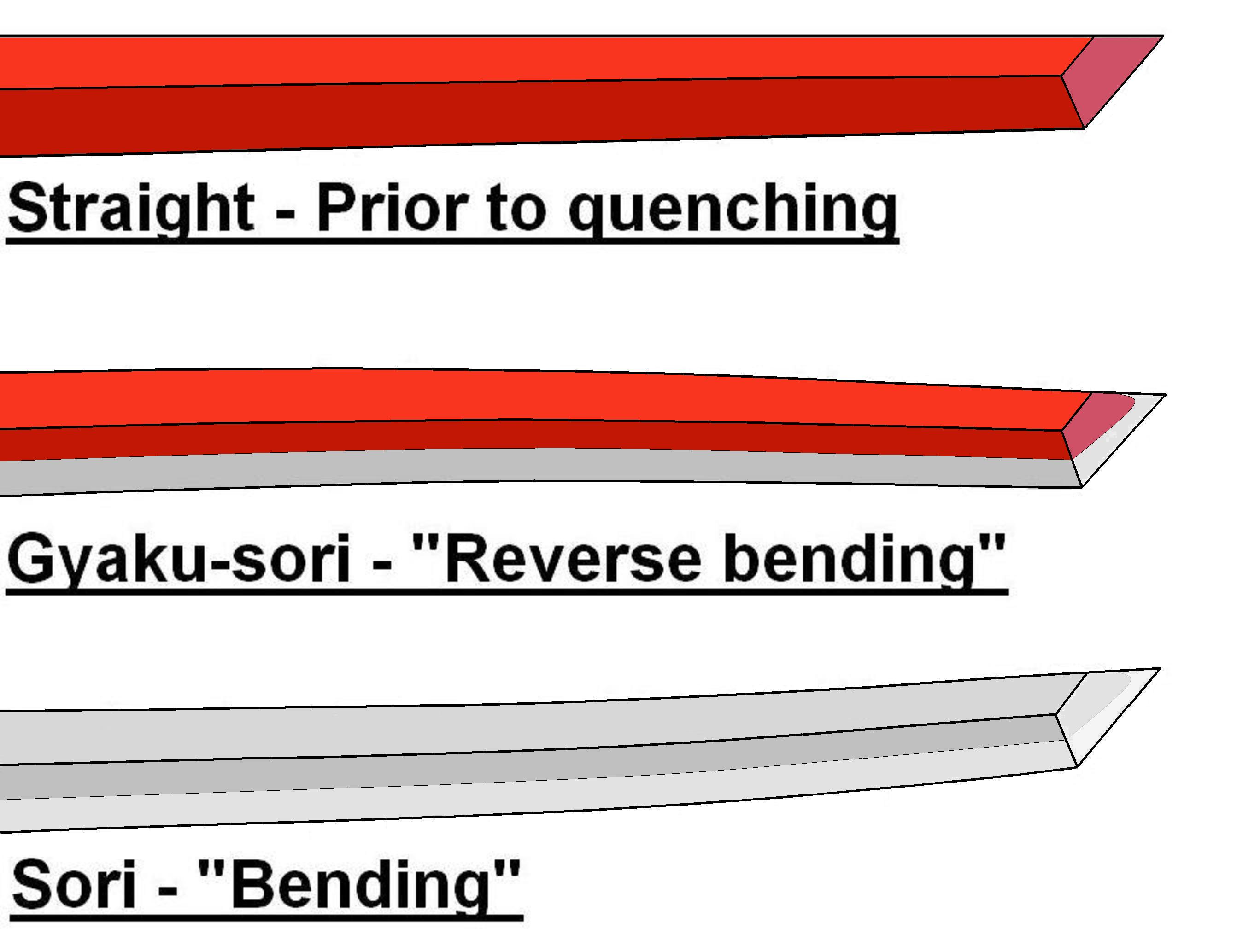
The curving of a katana as it cools at different rates

Having a single edge provides certain advantages; one being that the rest of the sword can be used to reinforce and support the edge. The Japanese style of sword-making takes full advantage of this. When forging is complete, the steel is not quenched in the conventional European fashion (i.e.: uniformly throughout the blade). Steel's exact flex and strength vary dramatically with heat treating. If steel cools quickly it becomes martensite, which is very hard but brittle. Slower and it becomes pearlite, which bends easily and does not hold an edge. To maximize both the cutting edge and the resilience of the sword spine, a technique of differential heat-treatment is used. In this specific process, referred to as differential hardening or differential quenching, the sword is painted with layers of clay before heating, providing a thin layer or none at all on the edge of the sword, ensuring quick cooling to maximize the hardening for the edge. A thicker layer of clay is applied to the rest of the blade, causing slower cooling. This creates softer, more resilient steel, allowing the blade to absorb shock without breaking. This process is sometimes erroneously called differential tempering but this is actually an entirely different form of heat treatment.

To produce a difference in hardness, the steel is cooled at different rates by controlling the thickness of the insulating layer. By carefully controlling the heating and cooling speeds of different parts of the blade, Japanese swordsmiths were able to produce a blade that had a softer body and a hard edge. This process also has two side effects that have come to characterize Japanese swords: 1.) It causes the blade to curve and 2.) It produces a visible boundary between the hard and soft steel. When quenched, the uninsulated edge contracts, causing the sword to first bend towards the edge. However, the edge cannot contract fully before the martensite forms, because the rest of the sword remains hot and in a thermally expanded state. Because of the insulation, the sword spine remains hot and pliable for several seconds but then contracts much more than the edge, causing the sword to bend away from the edge, which aids the smith in establishing the curvature of the blade. Also, the differentiated hardness and the methods of polishing the steel can result in the hamon 刃紋 (frequently translated as "tempering line" but better translated as "hardening pattern"). The hamon is the visible outline of the yakiba (hardened portion) and is used as a factor to judge both the quality and beauty of the finished blade. The various hamon patterns result from the manner in which the clay is applied. They can also act as an indicator of the style of sword-making and sometimes as a signature for the individual smith. The differences in the hardenability of steels may be enhanced near the hamon, revealing layers or even different parts of the blade, such as the intersection between an edge made from edge-steel and sides made from skin-steel.

When quenching in water, carbon is rapidly removed from the surface of the steel, lowering its hardenability. To ensure the proper hardness of the cutting edge, help prevent cracking, and achieve the proper depth of the martensite, the sword is quenched prior to creating the bevel for the edge. If the thickness of the coating on the edge is balanced just right with the temperature of the water, the proper hardness can be produced without the need for tempering. However, in most cases, the edge will end up being too hard, so tempering the entire blade evenly for a short time is usually required to bring the hardness down to a more suitable point. The ideal hardness is usually between HRc58 and 60 on the Rockwell hardness scale. Tempering is performed by heating the entire blade evenly to around 400 °F (204 °C), reducing the hardness in the martensite and turning it into a form of tempered martensite. The pearlite, on the other hand, does not respond to tempering and does not change in hardness. After the blade is heat treated, the smith would traditionally use a drawknife (sen) to bevel the edge and give the sword a rough shape before sending the blade to a specialist for sharpening and polishing. The polisher, in turn, determines the final geometry and curvature of the blade and makes any necessary adjustments.

=== Metallurgy ===
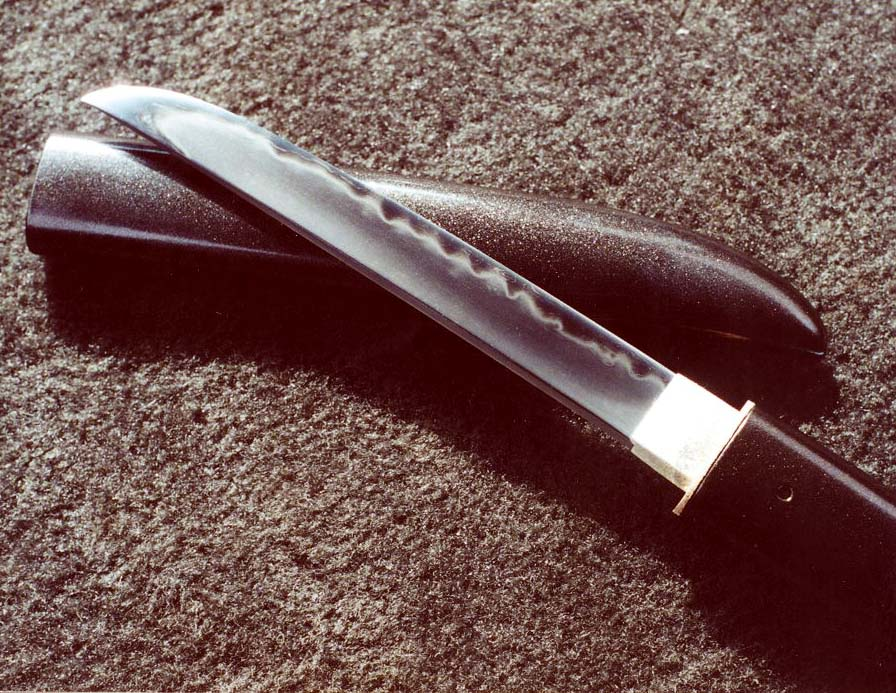
Tanto

Tamahagane, as a raw material, is a highly impure metal. Formed in a bloomery process, the bloom of sponge iron begins as an inhomogeneous mixture of wrought iron, steels, and pig iron. The pig iron contains more than 2% carbon. The high-carbon steel has about 1–1.5% carbon while the low-carbon iron contains about 0.2%. Steel that has a carbon content between the high- and low-carbon steel is called bu-kera, which is often re-smelted with the pig iron to make saga-hagane, containing roughly 0.7% carbon. Most of the intermediate-carbon steel, wrought iron and resmelted steel will be sold for making other items, like tools and knives, and only the best pieces of high-carbon steel, low-carbon iron, and pig iron are used for swordsmithing.

The various metals are also filled with slag, phosphorus and other impurities. Separation of the various metals from the bloom was traditionally performed by breaking it apart with small hammers dropped from a certain height, and then examining the fractures, in a process similar to the modern Charpy impact test. The nature of the fractures are different for different types of steel. The high-carbon steel, in particular, contains pearlite, which produces a characteristic pearlescent-sheen on the crystals.

During the folding process, most of the impurities are removed from the steel, continuously refining the steel while forging. By the end of forging, the steel produced was among the purest steel alloys of the ancient world. Continuous heating causes the steel to decarburize, so a good quantity of carbon is either extracted from the steel as carbon dioxide or redistributed more evenly through diffusion, leaving a nearly eutectoid composition (containing 0.77–0.8% carbon). The edge steel will generally end up with a composition that ranges from eutectoid to slightly hypoeutectoid (containing a carbon content under the eutectoid composition), giving enough hardenability without sacrificing ductility. The skin steel generally has slightly less carbon, often in the range of 0.5%. The core steel, however, remains nearly pure iron, responding very little to heat treatment. Cyril Stanley Smith, a professor of metallurgical history from Massachusetts Institute of Technology, performed an analysis of four different swords, each from a different century, determining the composition of the surface of the blades:

Blade composition
Era	Carbon (edge)	Carbon (body)	Manganese	Silicon	Phosphorus	Copper
1940s	1.02%	1.02%	0.37%	0.18%	0.015%	0.21%
1800s	0.62%	1.0%	0.01%	0.07%	0.046%	0.01%
1700s	0.69%	0.43%	0.005%	0.02%	0.075%	0.01%
1500s	0.5%	0.5%	0.005%	0.04%	0.034%	0.01%

In 1993, Jerzy Piaskowski performed an analysis of a katana of the kobuse type by cutting the sword in half and taking a cross section. The analysis revealed a carbon content ranging from 0.6 to 0.8% carbon at the surface and 0.2% at the core.

The steel in even the ancient swords may have sometimes come from whatever steel was available at the time. Because of its rarity in the ancient world, steel was usually recycled, so broken tools, nails and cookware often provided a supply of steel. Even steel looted from enemies in combat was valued for its use in swordsmithing.

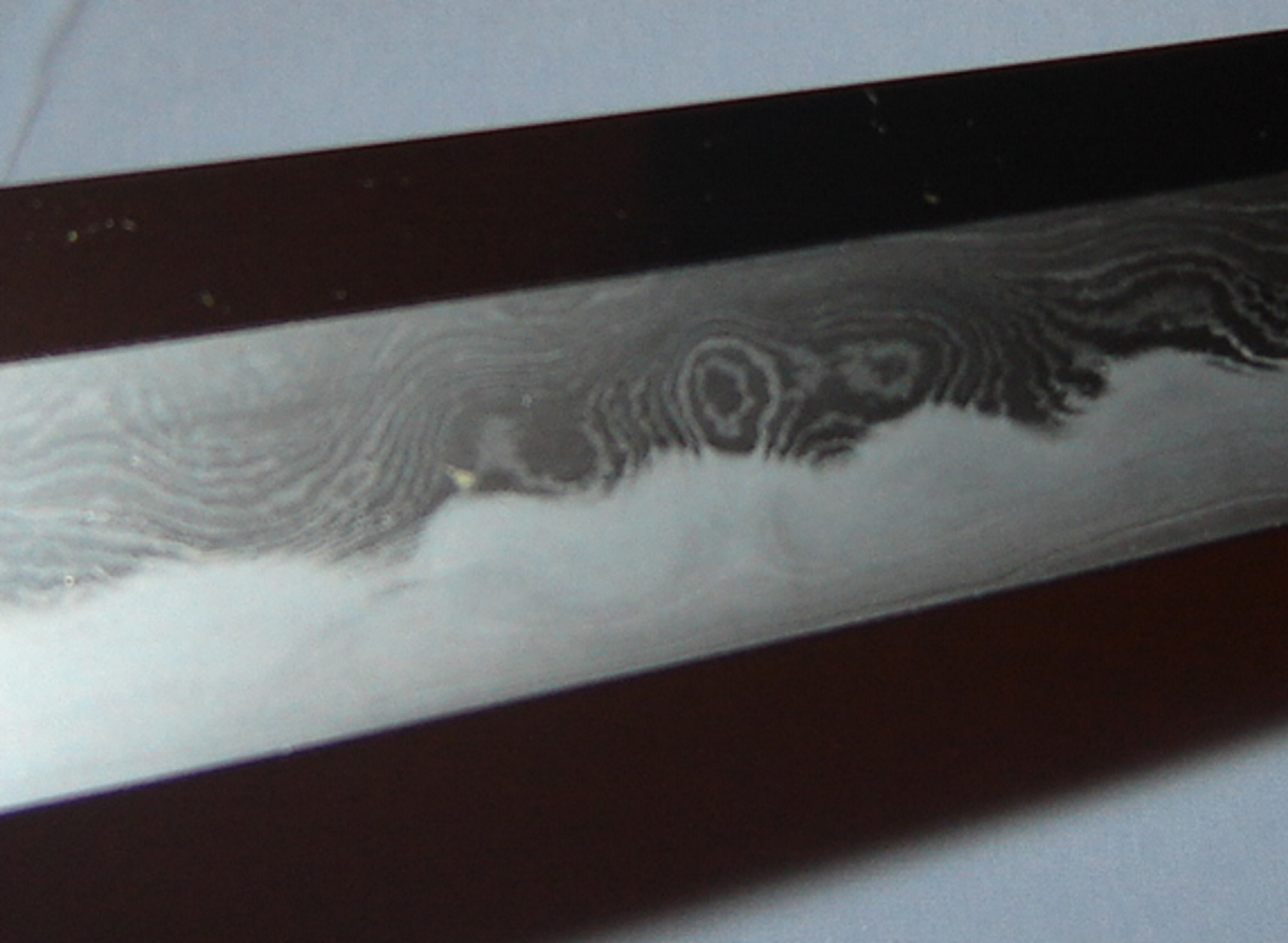
The different layers in this blade are evident by the difference in their carbon content, which is exaggerated at the hamon giving it a wispy appearance.

According to Smith, the different layers of steel are made visible during the polishing because of one or both of two reasons: 1) the layers have a variation in carbon content, or 2) they have variation in the content of slag inclusions. When the variation is from slag inclusions by themselves, there will not be a noticeable effect near the hamon, where the yakiba meets the hira. Likewise, there will be no appreciable difference in the local hardness of the individual layers. A difference in slag inclusions generally appears as layers that are somewhat pitted while the adjacent layers are not. In one of the first metallurgical studies, Professor Kuni-ichi Tawara suggests that layers of high slag may have been added for practical as well as decorative reasons. Although slag has a weakening effect on the metal, layers of high slag may have been added to diffuse vibration and dampen recoil, allowing easier use without a significant loss in toughness.

However, when the patterns occur from a difference in carbon content, there will be distinct indications of this near the hamon, because the steel with higher hardenability will become martensite beyond the hamon while the adjacent layers will turn into pearlite. This leaves a distinct pattern of bright nioi, which appear as bright streaks or lines that follow the layers a short distance away from the hamon and into the hira, giving the hamon a wispy or misty appearance. The patterns were most likely revealed during the polishing operation by using a method similar to lapping, without bringing the steel to a full polish, although sometimes chemical reactions with the polishing compounds may have also been used to provide a level of etching. The differences in hardness primarily appear as a difference in the microscopic scratches left on the surface. The harder metal produces shallower scratches, so it diffuses the reflected light, while the softer metal has deeper, longer scratches, appearing either shiny or dark depending on the viewing angle.

==== Metallography ====
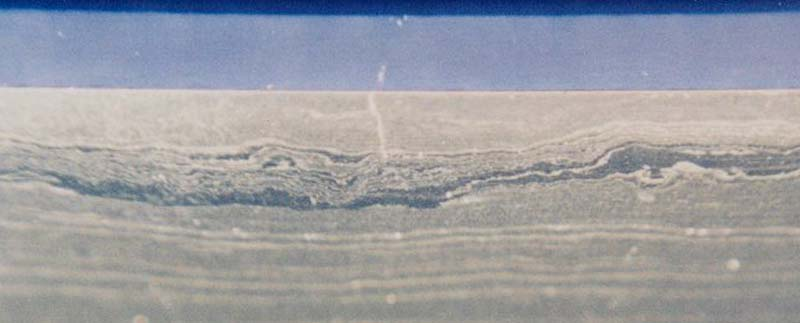
Layered steel forms a wood-grain pattern when the blade is filed and polished

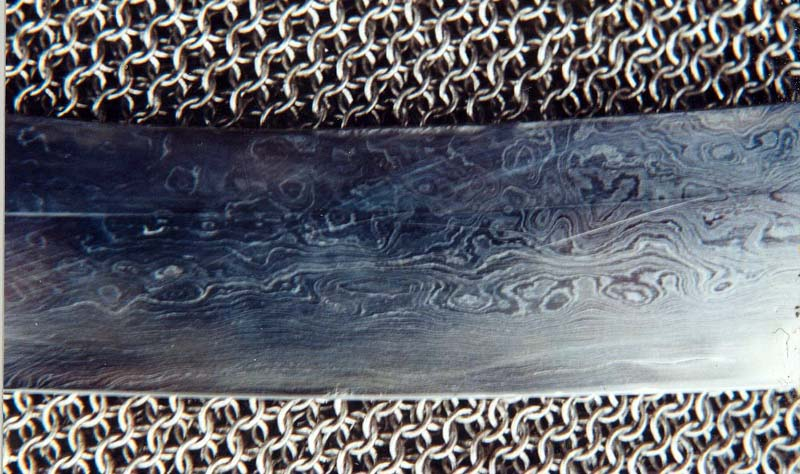
Blue mokumegane steel, showing knot-like patterns in the metal

Metallurgy did not arise as a science until the early 20th century. Before this, metallography was the primary method used for studying metals. Metallography is the study of the patterns in metals, the nature of fractures, and the microscopic crystal formations. However, neither metallography as a science nor the crystal theory of metals emerged until nearly a century after the invention of the microscope. The ancient swordsmiths had no knowledge of metallurgy, nor did they understand the relationship between carbon and iron. Everything was typically learned by a process of trial-and-error, apprenticeship, and, as sword-making technology was often a closely guarded secret, some espionage. Prior to the 14th century, very little attention was paid to the patterns in the blade as an aesthetic quality. However, the Japanese smiths often prided themselves on their understanding of the internal macro-structure of metals, including the layering, the wood grain-like structure, and use of different steel in different parts of the blade.

In Japan, nearly all metals, including weapons, were imported from the mainland until the 5th or 6th century, when steel-making technology was imported from China, most likely through Korea. The crucible steel used in the Chinese swords, called chi-kang (combined steel), was similar to pattern welding, and edges of it were often forge welded to a back of soft iron, or jou thieh. In trying to reverse engineer the Chinese method, the ancient smiths paid much attention to the various properties of steel and worked to combine them to produce a composite steel with an internal macro-structure that would provide a similar combination of hardness and toughness. Like all trial-and-error, each swordsmith often attempted to produce an internal structure that was superior to swords of their predecessors, or even ones that were better than their own previous designs. The harder metals provided strength, like "bones" within the steel, whereas the softer metal provided ductility, allowing the swords to bend before breaking. In ancient times, the Japanese smiths would often display these inhomogeneities in the steel, especially on fittings like the guard or pommel, creating rough, natural surfaces by letting the steel rust or by pickling it in acid, making the internal structure part of the entire aesthetic of the weapon. In later times, this effect was often imitated by partially mixing various metals like copper together with the steel, forming mokume (wood-eye) patterns, although this was unsuitable for the blade.

After the 14th century, the Japanese technology had reached a pinnacle, and little more could be done to improve the mechanical properties even by modern standards, thus more attention began to be paid to the patterns in the blade as an aesthetic quality. From then on advancements progressed along an artistic path and swords became regarded for their beauty as much as their suitability as a weapon. Decorative hamons began to emerge around that time consisting of various wavy or tooth-like shapes, by shaping the clay. Soon after, intentionally-decorative forging techniques were often employed, such as hammering dents in certain locations or drawing out the steel with fullers, which served to create a mokume pattern when the sword was filed and polished into shape, or by intentionally forging in layers of high slag content. By the 17th century, hamons with trees, flowers, pill boxes, or other shapes became common during this era. By the 19th century, the decorative hamons were often being combined with decorative folding techniques to create entire landscapes, often portraying specific islands or scenery, crashing waves in the ocean, and misty mountain peaks.

=== Decoration ===
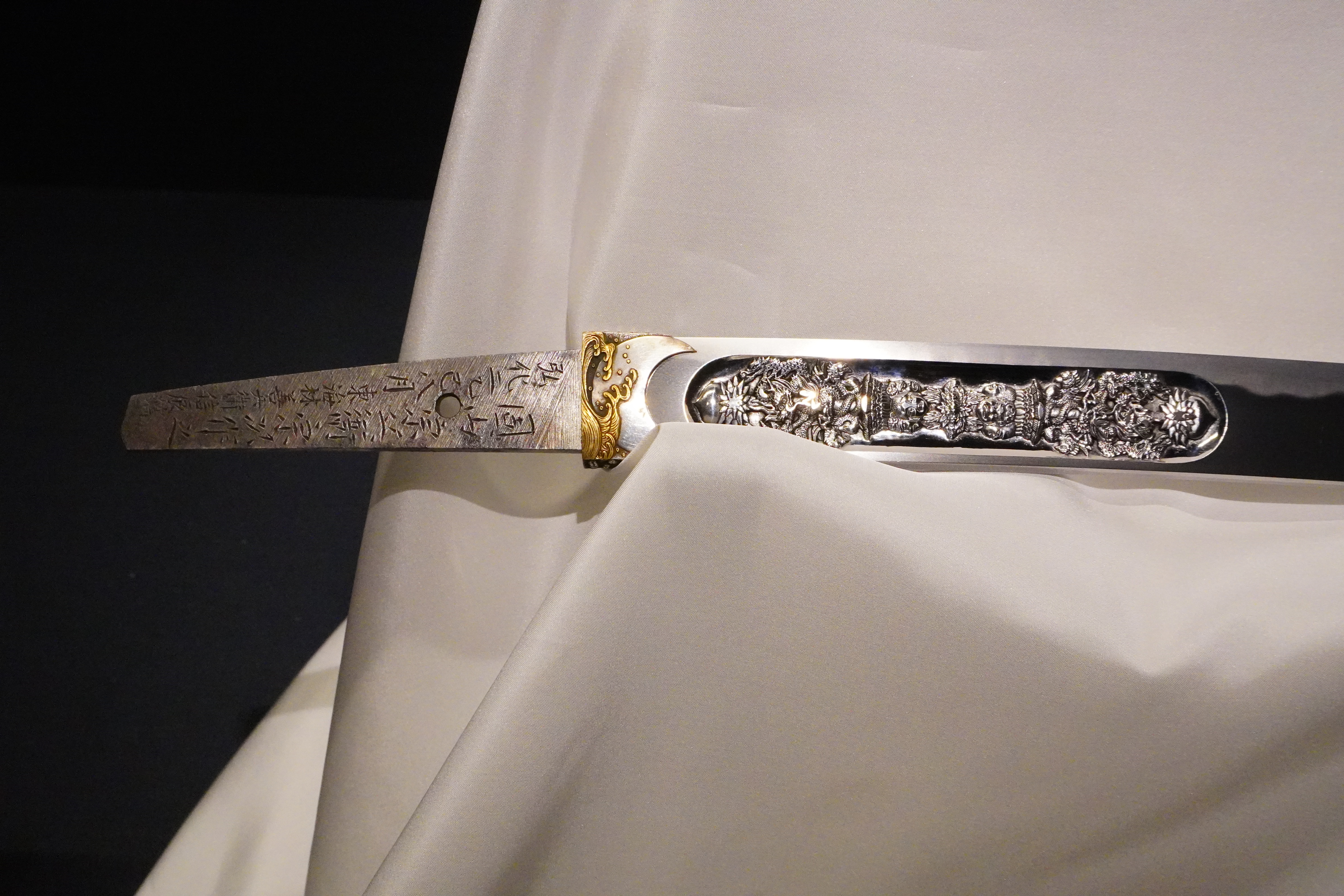
Examples of file marks (yasurime), signatures and dates (mei) engraved on the tang (nakago), blade collar (habaki) attached to the tang, and horimono engraved on the blade. It is inscribed that Koyama Sōbei Munetsugu forged the sword in August Kōka 2 and Shōji Zenbei Nobutatsu engraved the blade horimono. A vajra is engraved to pray for the protection of the offspring. Edo period

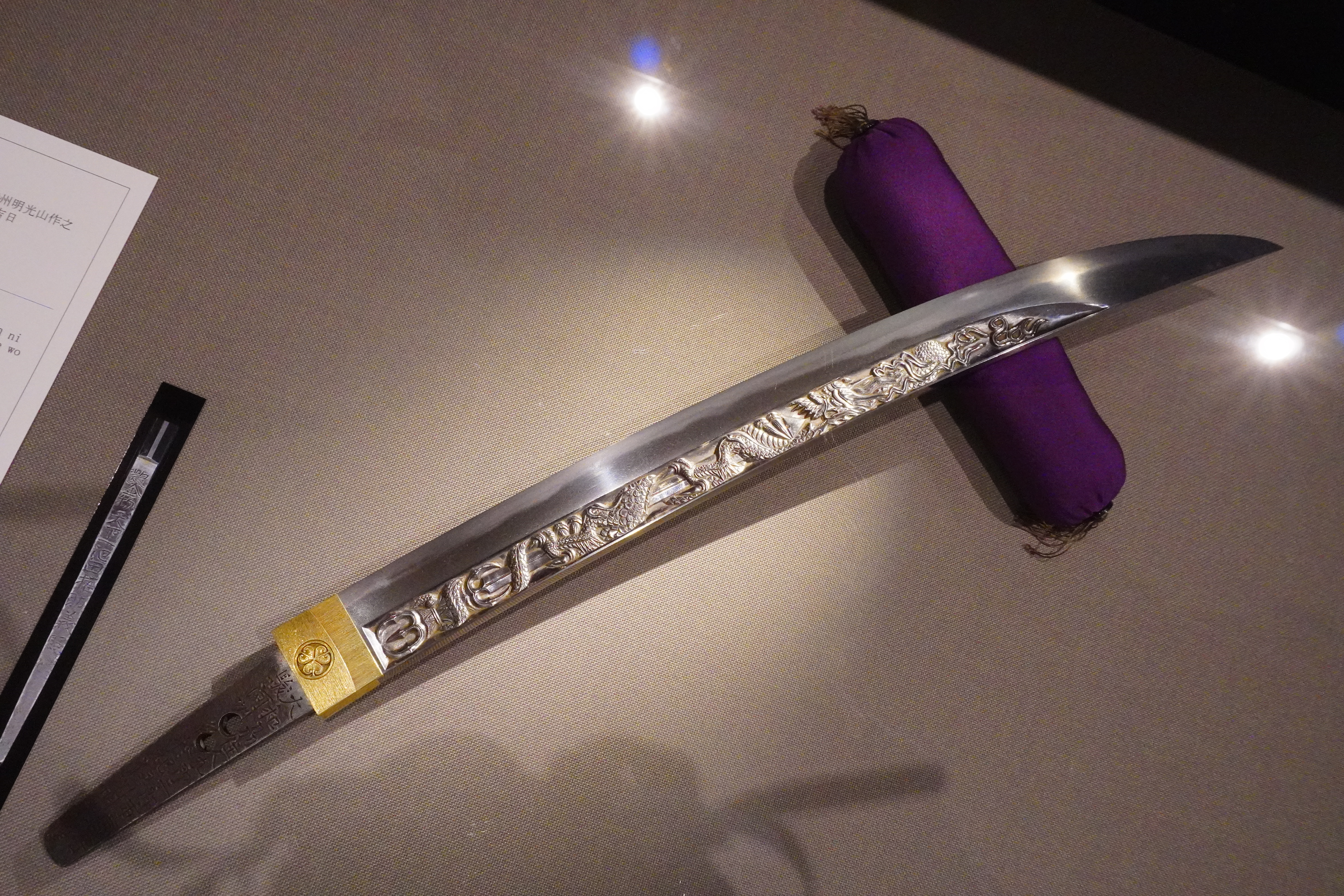
Wakizashi forged by Nanki Shigekuni (ja) with a horimono engraved on the blade by Ikeda Gonsuke Yoshiteru. Edo period, 1622, Important Sword

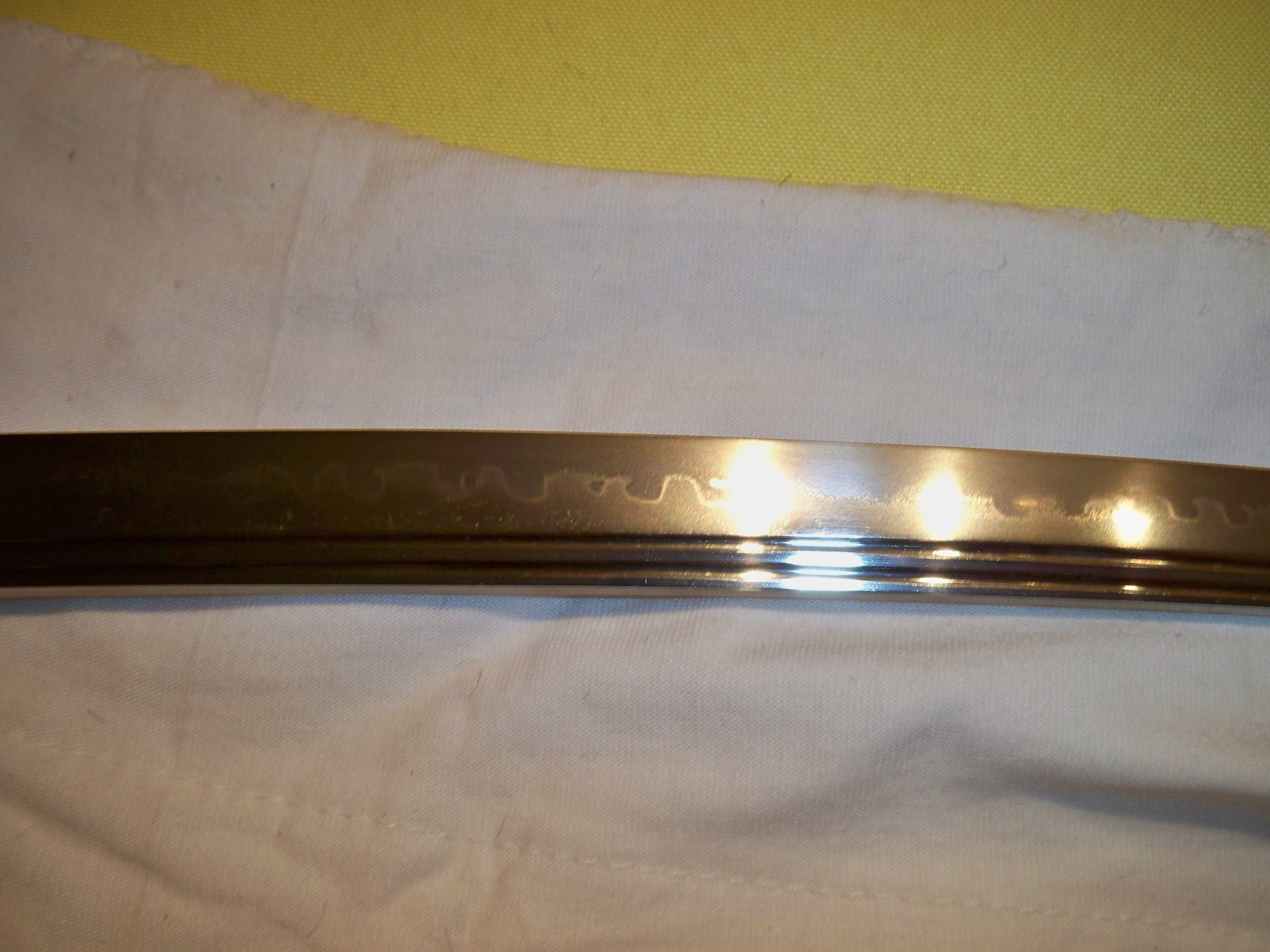
A section of an antique Japanese katana showing two grooves bo-hi and the temper line hamon

Almost all blades are decorated, although not all blades are decorated on the visible part of the blade. Once the blade is cool and the mud is scraped off, the blade has designs and grooves cut into it. One of the most important markings on the sword is performed here: the file markings. These are cut into the tang (nakago), or the hilt section of the blade, during shaping, where they will be covered by a tsuka or hilt later. The tang is never supposed to be cleaned: doing this can cut the value of the sword in half or more. The purpose is to show how well the blade steel ages. Different types of file markings are used, including horizontal, slanted, and checked, known as ichi-monji, ko-sujikai, sujikai, ō-sujikai, katte-agari, shinogi-kiri-sujikai, taka-no-ha, and gyaku-taka-no-ha. A grid of marks, from raking the file diagonally both ways across the tang, is called higaki, whereas specialized "full dress" file marks are called kesho-yasuri. Lastly, if the blade is very old, it may have been shaved instead of filed. This is called sensuki. While ornamental, these file marks also serve the purpose of providing an uneven surface which bites well into the hilt which fits over it. It is this pressure fit for the most part that holds the hilt in place, while the mekugi pin serves as a secondary method and a safety.

Some other marks on the blade are aesthetic: signatures and dedications written in kanji and engravings depicting gods, dragons, or other acceptable beings, called horimono. Some are more practical. The so-called "blood groove" or fuller does not in actuality allow blood to flow more freely from cuts made with the sword but is to reduce the weight of the sword while keeping structural integrity and strength. Grooves come in wide (bo-hi), twin narrow (futasuji-hi), twin wide and narrow (bo-hi ni tsure-hi), short (koshi-hi), twin short (gomabushi), twin long with joined tips (shobu-hi), twin long with irregular breaks (kuichigai-hi), and halberd-style (naginata-hi).

=== Polishing ===
Japanese sword blade, sharpening stone, and water bucket at the 2008 Cherry Blossom Festival, Seattle Center, Seattle, Washington

When the rough blade is completed, the swordsmith turns the blade over to a polisher (togishi) whose job is to refine the shape of a blade and improve its aesthetic value. The entire process takes considerable time, in some cases easily up to several weeks. Early polishers used three types of stone, whereas a modern polisher generally uses seven. The modern high level of polish was not normally done before around 1600, since greater emphasis was placed on function over form. The polishing process almost always takes longer than even crafting, and a good polish can greatly improve the beauty of a blade, while a bad one can ruin the best of blades. More importantly, inexperienced polishers can permanently ruin a blade by badly disrupting its geometry or wearing down too much steel, both of which effectively destroy the sword's monetary, historic, artistic, and functional value.

=== Mountings ===
In Japanese, the scabbard for a katana is referred to as a saya, and the handguard piece, often intricately designed as an individual work of art—especially in later years of the Edo period—was called the tsuba. Other aspects of the mountings (koshirae), such as the menuki (decorative grip swells), habaki (blade collar and scabbard wedge), fuchi and kashira (handle collar and cap), kozuka (small utility knife handle), kogai (decorative skewer-like implement), saya lacquer, and tsuka-ito (professional handle wrap, also named emaki), received similar levels of artistry.

After the blade is finished it is passed on to a mountings maker, or sayashi (literally "sheath maker" but referring to those who make fittings in general). Sword mountings vary in their exact nature depending on the era but consist of the same general idea, with the variation being in the components used and in the wrapping style. The obvious part of the hilt consists of a metal or wooden grip called a tsuka, which can also be used to refer to the entire hilt. The hand guard, or tsuba, on Japanese swords (except for certain 20th century sabers which emulate Western navies') is small and round, made of metal, and often very ornate. (See koshirae.)

There is a pommel at the base known as a kashira, and there is often a decoration under the braided wrappings called a menuki. A bamboo peg called a mekugi is slipped through the tsuka and through the tang of the blade, using the hole called a mekugi-ana ("peg hole") drilled in it. This anchors the blade securely into the hilt. To anchor the blade securely into the sheath it will soon have, the blade acquires a collar, or habaki, which extends an inch or so past the hand guard and keeps the blade from rattling.

There are two types of sheaths, both of which require exacting work to create. One is the shirasaya, which is generally made of wood and considered the "resting" sheath, used as a storage sheath. The other sheath is the more decorative or battle-worthy sheath which is usually called either a jindachi-zukuri, if suspended from the obi (belt) by straps (tachi-style), or a buke-zukuri sheath if thrust through the obi (katana-style). Other types of mounting include the kyū-guntō, shin-guntō, and kai-guntō types for the twentieth-century military.

== Modern swordsmithing ==
Traditional swords are still made in Japan and occasionally elsewhere; they are termed "shinsakuto" or "shinken" (true sword), and can be very expensive. These are not considered reproductions as they are made by traditional techniques and from traditional materials. Swordsmiths in Japan are licensed; acquiring this license requires a long apprenticeship. Outside Japan there are a couple of smiths working by traditional or mostly traditional techniques, and occasional short courses taught in Japanese swordsmithing.

A very large number of low-quality reproduction katana and wakizashi are available; their prices usually range between $10 and about $200. These cheap blades are Japanese in shape only—they are usually machine made and machine sharpened and minimally hardened or heat-treated. The hamon pattern (if any) on the blade is applied by scuffing, etching, or otherwise marking the surface, without any difference in hardness or temper of the edge. The metal used to make low-quality blades is mostly cheap stainless steel, and typically is much harder and more brittle than true katana. Finally, cheap reproduction Japanese swords usually have fancy designs on them since they are just for show. Better-quality reproduction katana typically range from $200 to about $1000 (though some can go easily above $2000 for quality production blades, folded and often traditionally constructed and with a proper polish), and high-quality or custom-made reproductions can go up to $15,000–$50,000. These blades are made to be used for cutting and are usually heat-treated. High-quality reproductions made from carbon steel will often have a differential hardness or temper similar to traditionally made swords, and will show a hamon; they will not show a hada (grain), since they are generally not made from folded steel.

A wide range of steels are used in reproductions, ranging from carbon steels such as 1020, 1040, 1060, 1070, 1095, and 5160, stainless steels such as 400, 420, 440, to high-end specialty steels such as L6 and S7. Most cheap reproductions are made from inexpensive stainless steels such as 440A (often just termed "440"). With a normal Rockwell hardness of 56 and up to 60, stainless steel is much harder than the back of a differentially hardened katana (HR50), and is therefore much more prone to breaking, especially when used to make long blades. Stainless steel is also much softer at the edge (a traditional katana is usually more than HR60 at the edge). Furthermore, cheap swords designed as wall-hanging or sword rack decorations often also have a "rat-tail" tang, which is a thin, usually threaded bolt of metal welded onto the blade at the hilt area. These are a major weak point and often break at the weld, resulting in a dangerous and unreliable sword.

Some modern swordsmiths have made high quality reproduction swords using the traditional method, including one Japanese swordsmith who began manufacturing swords in Thailand using traditional methods, and various American and Chinese manufacturers. These however will always be different from Japanese swords made in Japan, as it is illegal to export the tamahagane jewel steel as such without it having been made into value-added products first. Nevertheless, some manufacturers have made differentially tempered swords folded in the traditional method available for relatively little money (often one to three thousand dollars), and differentially tempered, non-folded steel swords for several hundred. Some practicing martial artists prefer modern swords, whether of this type or made in Japan by Japanese craftsmen, because many of them cater to martial arts demonstrations by designing "extra light" swords which can be maneuvered relatively faster for longer periods of time, or swords specifically designed to perform well at cutting practice targets, with thinner blades and either razor-like flat-ground or hollow ground edges.

== Notable swordsmiths ==
- Amakuni legendary swordsmith who supposedly created the first single-edged longsword with curvature along the edge in the Yamato Province around 700 AD
- Masamune (c. 1264 – 1343)
- Hikoshiro Sadamune (1298–1349)
- Shintōgo Kunimitsu (13th century)
- Nagasone Kotetsu (c. 1597 – 1678)
- Muramasa (16th century)
- Kanenobu (17th century)
- Kenzō Kotani (1909–2003)
- Masamine Sumitani (1921–1998)
- Akitsugu Amata (1927–2013)
- Okubo Kazuhira (1943–2003)

== See also ==
- Maraging steel for fencing blades – highly breakage resistant, very good for pointed weapons, not good for edged
