= List of Intangible Cultural Properties of Japan (Nara) =

This list is of the Intangible Cultural Properties of Japan in the Prefecture of Nara.

== National Cultural Properties ==
As of 1 November 2015, two Important Intangible Cultural Properties have been designated.

=== Performing Arts ===
| Property | Holder | Comments | Image | Ref. |
|---|---|---|---|---|
| Noh - Kotsuzumi 能楽・小鼓; Nōgaku kotsuzumi | Araki Kensaku (荒木建作) | | | |
| Gidayū-bushi 義太夫節; Gidayū-bushi | Tomizawa Hinafumi (豊澤雛文) | | | |

== Prefectural Cultural Properties ==
As of 1 May 2015, three properties have been designated at a prefectural level.

=== Craft Techniques ===
| Property | Holder | Comments | Image | Ref. |
|---|---|---|---|---|
| Nara-Zarashi Cloth Bleaching Technique 奈良晒の紡織技術; Nara-zarashi no bōshoku gijutsu | Nara-zarashi Technique Preservation Society (奈良晒技術保存会) | | | |
| Japanese Swordsmithing Technique 日本刀製作技術; Nihontō seisaku gijutsu | Gassan Sadatoshi (月山貞利) | from the Gassan School (月山) | | |
| Japanese Swordsmithing Technique 日本刀製作技術; Nihontō seisaku gijutsu | Kawachi Kunihira (河内國平) | | | |

== Municipal Cultural Properties ==
As of 1 May 2015, two properties have been designated at a municipal level.

=== Performing Arts ===
| Property | Holder | Comments | Image | Ref. |
|---|---|---|---|---|
| Sugō Shrine Noh (Kasuga Jinja) 菅生春楽社能楽（春日神社） Sugō shunrakusha nōgaku (Kasuga Jinja) | Noh Preservation Society (能楽保存会) | in Yamazoe | | |
| Yakumo-koto 八雲琴; Yagumo-goto | Asuka Sound Preservation Society (明日香の響保存会) | in Asuka | | |
