= Akitsugu =

- Gender: Male

Origin
- Origin: Japanese
- Meaning: Different meanings depending on the kanji used

Akitsugu (written: 昭次) is a masculine Japanese given name. Notable people with the name include:

- Akitsugu Amata (天田 昭次; 1927–2013), Japanese swordsmith
- Akitsugu Konno (金野 昭次; 1944-2019), Japanese ski jumper
