= Yasunori =

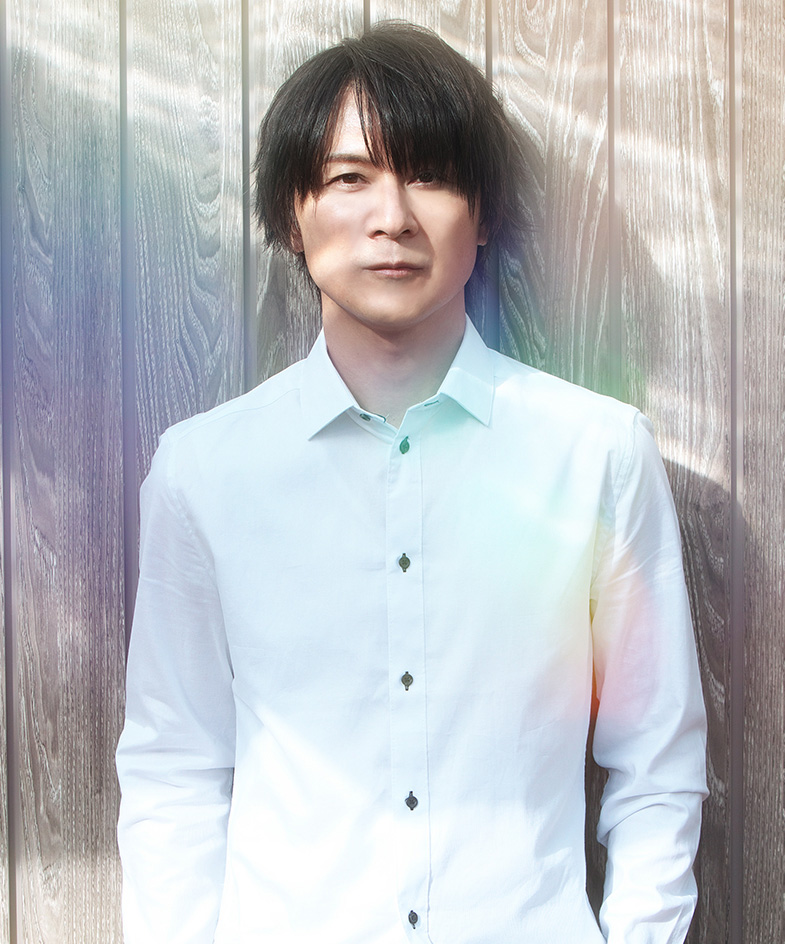
- Yasunori Mitsuda, Japanese composer known for his video game music
- Pronunciation: jasɯnoɾi (IPA)
- Gender: Male

Origin
- Origin: Japanese
- Meaning: Different meanings depending on the kanji used

Yasunori is a masculine Japanese given name.

== Written forms ==
Yasunori can be written using many different combinations of kanji characters. Here are some examples:

- 安徳, "tranquil, benevolence"
- 安紀, "tranquil, chronicle"
- 安典, "tranquil, law code"
- 安範, "tranquil, pattern"
- 安憲, "tranquil, constitution"
- 安法, "tranquil, method"
- 保徳, "preserve, benevolence"
- 保紀, "preserve, chronicle"
- 保典, "preserve, law code"
- 保範, "preserve, pattern"
- 保憲, "preserve, constitution"
- 保法, "preserve, method"
- 靖徳, "peaceful, benevolence"
- 靖紀, "peaceful, chronicle"
- 靖典, "peaceful, law code"
- 泰徳, "peaceful, benevolence"
- 康規, "healthy, to scheme"
- 八洲乗, "8, continent, to get on"

The name can also be written in hiragana やすのり or katakana ヤスノリ.

== Notable people with the name ==
- Yasunori Hayashi (林 康紀, born 1965), Japanese neuroscientist
- Yasunori Honda (本田 保則; born 1943), anime sound director
- Yasunori Ide (井出 安軌), producer of the Onegai anime
- Yasunori Imamura (今村 泰典; born 1953), Japanese lutenist
- Yasunori Kotani (小谷 靖憲; 1909–2003), better known as Kenzō Kotani (小谷 憲三), swordmaker
- Yasunori Masutani (増谷 康紀; born 1961), Japanese voice actor
- Yasunori Matsumoto (松本 保典; born 1960), Japanese voice actor
- Yasunori Mitsuda (光田 康典; born 1972), composer from Yamaguchi Prefecture known for his video game music
- Yasunori Miyabe (宮部 保範; born 1966), speed skater
- Yasunori Miyoshi (三好 保徳; 1909–1995), Japanese zoologist, ichthyologist, and myriapodologist
- Yasunori Nishiki (西木 康智; born 1985), Japanese composer
- Yasunori Nomura (野村 泰紀; born 1974), Japanese theoretical physicist
- Yasunori Ogura (小倉 靖典; born 1958), Japanese master of Shotokan karate
- Yasunori Okuda (奥田 靖典; born 1972), Japanese mixed martial artist
- Yasunori Sakurazawa (櫻澤 泰徳; born 1969), better known as Sakura, a former drummer for the band L'Arc~en~Ciel
- Seizō Yasunori (安則 盛三; 1924–1945), Japanese student who joined the Imperial Japanese Navy
- Yasunori Shimura (志村 康徳; 1950–2020), better known as Ken Shimura, an actor and comedian
- Yasunori Suzuki (鈴木 康範; 1969–2019), Japanese serial killer
- Yasunori Takada (高田 保則; born 1979), J-league soccer (football) player
- Takenouchi Yasunori (竹内 保徳; 1807–1867), Japanese Samurai Lord
- Yasunori Watanabe (渡辺 泰憲; 1974–2010), Japanese rugby union player
- Yasunori Yamada (山田 靖智), Japanese anime screenwriter
- Yasunori Yasuda (保田 靖則; born 1952), Japanese volleyball player

== Fictional characters ==
- Yasunori Kato (加藤 保憲), fictional villain in Hiroshi Aramata's Teito Monogatari
