= Akitsugu Amata =

Japanese swordsmith

Akitsugu Amata (天田昭次, Amata Akitsugu) (also known as Amata Seiichi (天田 誠一)) (born 1927 – July 5, 2013) was a Japanese swordsmith.

Amata followed his father Amata Sadayoshi into the trade of sword-making after the latter died in 1937, moving to Tokyo from his home in Niigata Prefecture in order to enroll in a specialist sword-making school. This school, the Nihonto Tanren Denshu Jo, was run by the noted swordsmith Kurihara Hikosaburo, who originally employed Amata as a masseur before teaching him the basics of sword-making when the boy was thirteen. Amata worked at Kurihara's institute for the next six years.

After leaving Tokyo, Amata returned to his home village. He resided there since, claiming that the local water and clay (which contains a large amount of iron oxide) were very suitable for the yaki-ire (hardening process) of sword manufacture. He also smelted his own tamahagane steel at home.

After the Second World War the American occupying forces prohibited the manufacture of traditional swords in Japan. When the ban was partially lifted, Amata was awarded an official swordsmith's licence from the Cultural Properties Protection Committee in 1954; that same year he won the Yushu-wo prize at the first National Sword-Forging Competition.

An illness at 33 rendered Amata an invalid for eight years. However, after his recovery he went on to win the Masamune Prize (the highest accolade) at the New Katana Sword Exhibition in 1968; he also won the same award at the Sword-Forging Competition in 1977, 1985 and 1996. In 1997 he was named as a Living National Treasure of Japan.

Amata was the Chairman of the All Japan Swordsmith's Association and a director of the Nihon Bijutsu Token Hozon Kyokai.
