= Kanenobu =

Kanenobu [兼信, 兼延, 兼言] is the name of both a Japanese swordsmith and his clan, a group that is famous for producing samurai swords, katana, wakizashi and, occasionally, spears in the style of the Mino School - Tōkaidō. The history of the family covers a period of more than 600 years. SHIZU KANEUJI was the founder in Mino and was a student of Masamune.

According to Victor Harris, Keeper at the Department of Japanese Antiquities at the British Museum, the first-generation Kanenobu worked around the year 1345 in Mino province, an area that was famous for its swords.

All generations are recognized as leading swordsmiths in the koto and shinto eras, and some of his relatives are still active today. In 2004, one of Kanenobu's relatives participated in the NBTHK sword forging competition.

Little is known about the 1st and 2nd generation Kanenobu smiths. The 3rd generation of the smith signed Mutsu (no) Kami Fujiwara Kanenobu and Kambe Ju. One smith in the family was a direct pupil of Kaneuji, who founded the Shizu school.

At one of the most spectacular Japanese sword exhibitions recently held, the one held at the British Museum in London, England, one of the masterpieces displayed was a third-generation Kanenobu sword that was made sometime between 1688 and 1704.

Kanenobu specialized in the sambon sugi style of hamon and, most frequently, used the togari gunome-midare style.

NBTHK Tokubetsu Hozon Wakizashi from Mutsu no Kami Fujiwara Kanenobu, a Mino smith in the 17th century.

Kissaki

Tokubetsu Hozon

Habaki

== See also ==
- Katana
- Wakizashi
- Samurai
