= Japanese Sword Museum =

Coordinates: 35.681456°N 139.69089°E

- 刀剣博物館
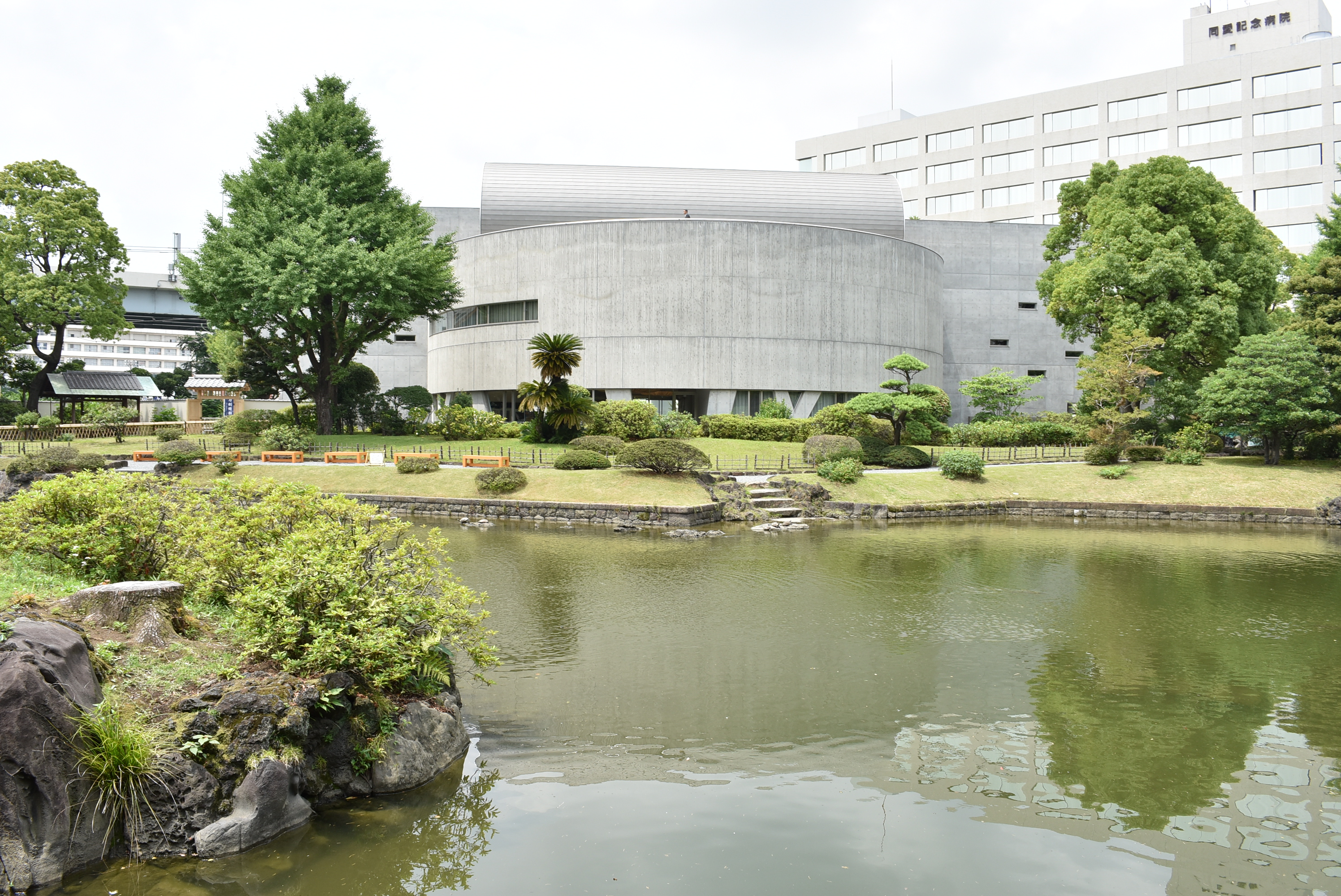
- Japanese Sword Museum (2018)
- Established: January 19, 2018 (present location)
- Location: 1-12-9, Yokoami, Sumida-ku, 130-0015, Tokyo, Japan
- Type: Art museum, Military museum
- Collection size: 190 items
- Public transit access: Tokyo Metro: Ryogoku; JR East: Chūō-Sōbu Line; Toei Oedo Line
- Website: www.touken.or.jp

The Japanese Sword Museum or Tōken hakubutsukan (刀剣博物館) situated in Tokyo, is a small museum dedicated to the art of Japanese swordmaking. It preserves and displays swords. It is operated by Nihon Bijutsu Token Hozon Kyokai (NBTHK, The Society for Preservation of Japanese Art Swords). The association's office is located inside the museum building.

== Overview ==
It is one of the few museums in Japan that specializes in Japanese swords. Works donated by sword enthusiasts are entrusted with storage and management. The old Japanese Sword Museum, located in Yoyogi 4-chome, Shibuya-ku, closed at the end of March 2017, and the new Japanese Sword Museum opened in January 2018.

The museum is run by The Society for Preservation of Japanese Art Swords.

== Collection ==
The museum has a collection of about 190 items, including swords (mainly katana), tosogu (mountings), yoroi (armor) as well as documents of metal working and metalwork materials. Some of the swords have been designated and certified by the national government as national treasures, important cultural properties, and important art objects. There is a property, and works of each age and school are stored, centering on old masterpieces of the Heian, Kamakura, and northern and southern clans.

== Timeline ==
- 1948 (Showa 23)
  - February 24-The Japan Art Swords Preservation Association is established with the permission of the Minister of Education, Culture, Sports, Science and Technology to preserve and inherit the Japanese swords that were in a state of destruction due to the confiscation by the troops stationed after the war (the office is in Tokyo). Located in the National Museum ).
  - September—Started a certification system for swords, etc. to preserve swords.
- January 1955-The 1st sword technology presentation.
- June 1958 (Showa 33) --Establish an important designation system for swords, etc.
- May 25, 1968-The Japanese Sword Museum opens.

1977 (Showa 52)

  - May- Certified Tamahagane manufacturing selection / preservation technology selection, Yuzo Abe, and Koji Hisamura .
  - November- Reconstruction of the Japanese sword in Yokota Town, Shimane Prefecture .
- August 1982 (Showa 57) --Abolished the certification system for swords, etc., and changed to the sword appraisal system.
- September 1989—Started the 1st Swordsmith Swordsmithing Technology Workshop of the Agency for Cultural Affairs.
- March 31, 2017—Closed for rebuilding.
- January 19, 2018—Opened in the New Sword Museum, Sumida Ward, Former Yasuda Garden (Ryogoku Public Hall site).

== Sword Museum Building ==
Here are some details about the Japanese Sword Museum building.

- Construction site: Former Yasuda Garden, 1-12-9 Yokoami, Sumida-ku, Tokyo 130-0015
- Site area: 2157.9m 2
- Building area: 1076.9m 2
- Total floor area: 2619.8m 2
- Structural scale: Reinforced concrete construction (partially steel frame construction) 3 stories above ground
- Building height: 15.6m
- Design company: Maki General Planning Office
- Construction company: Toda Corporation
- Opened: January 2018 (Heisei 30)

== Gallery ==
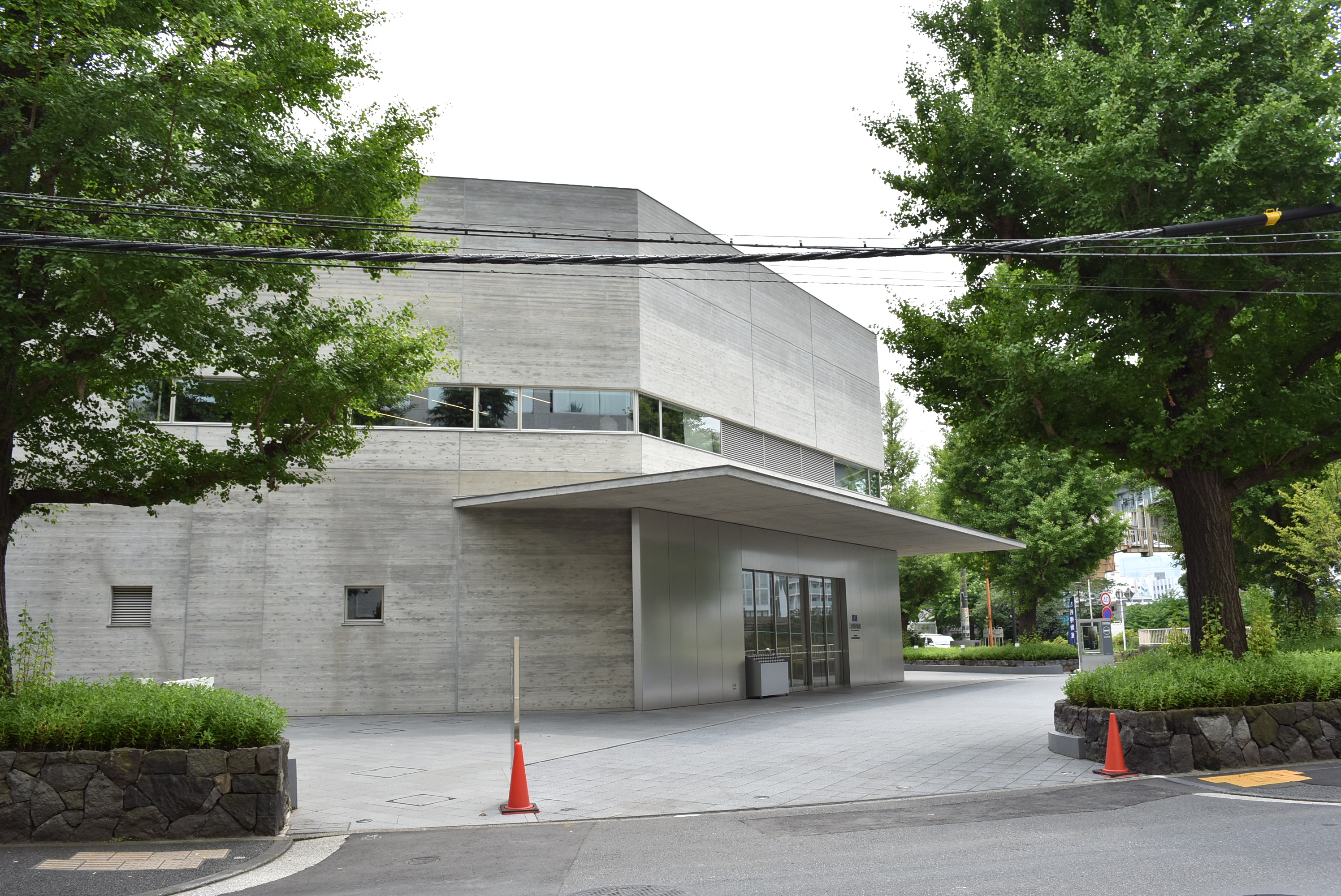
Appearance on the public road side

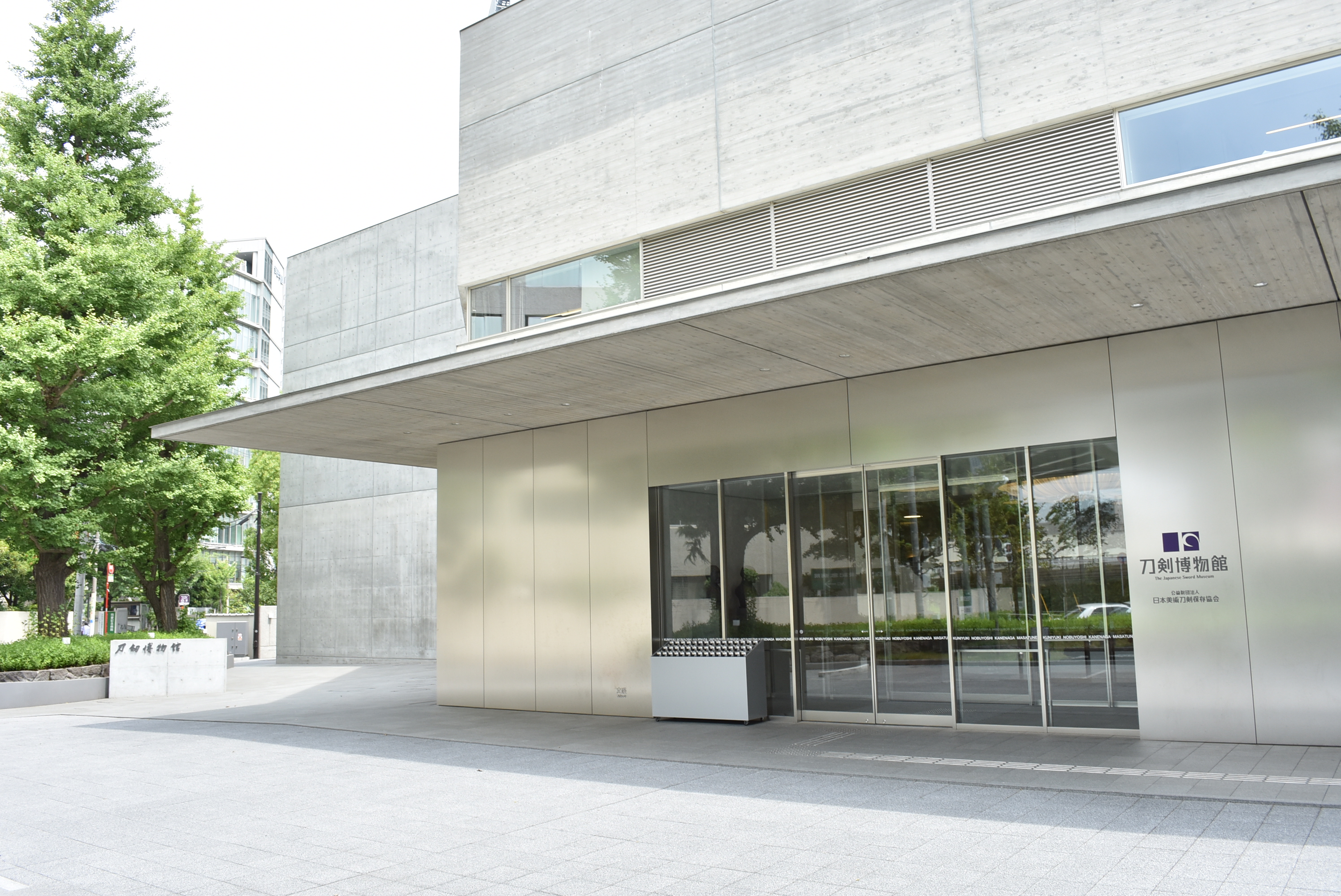
At the entrance

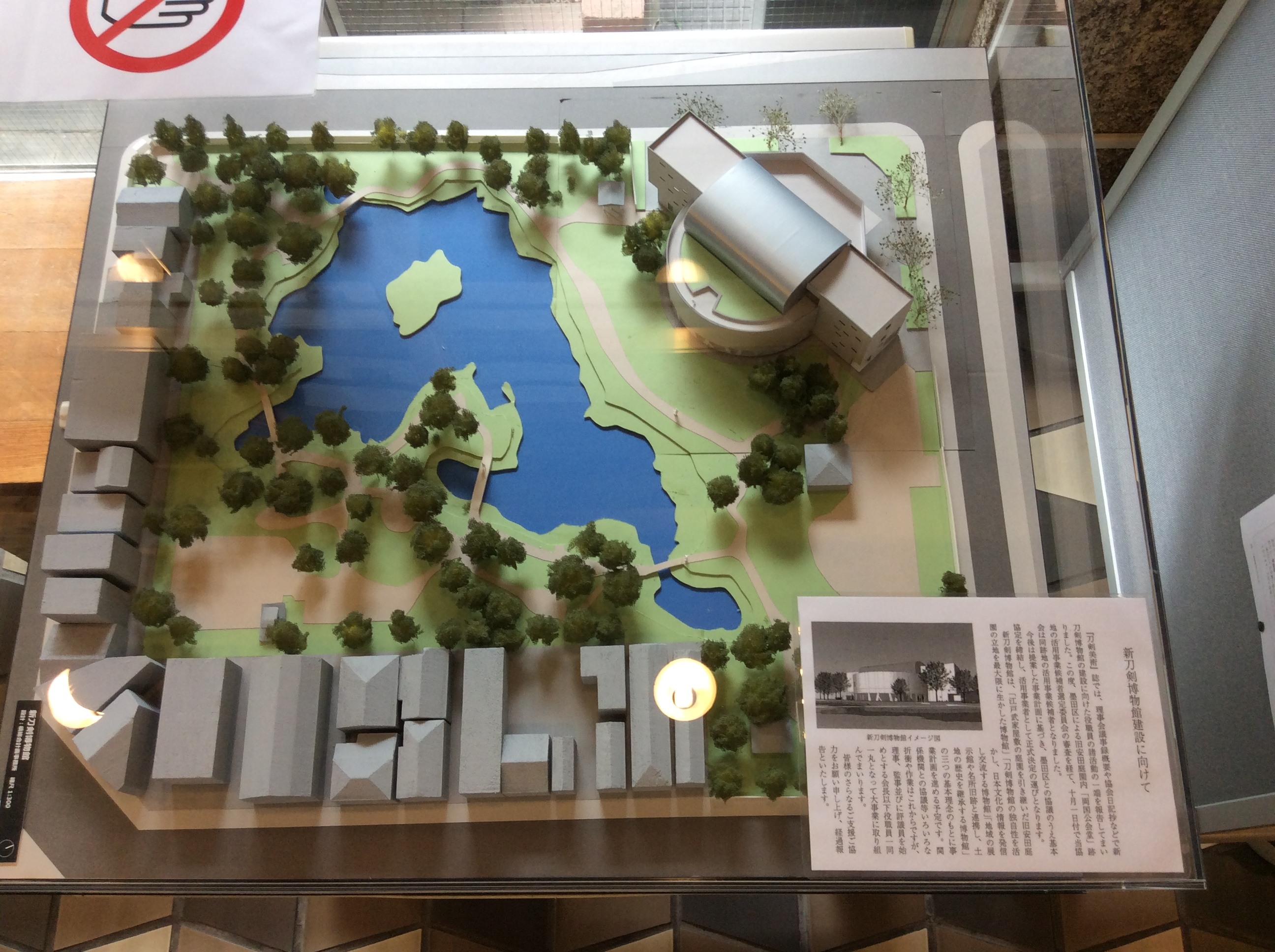
Completed model of the New Sword Museum (2018)

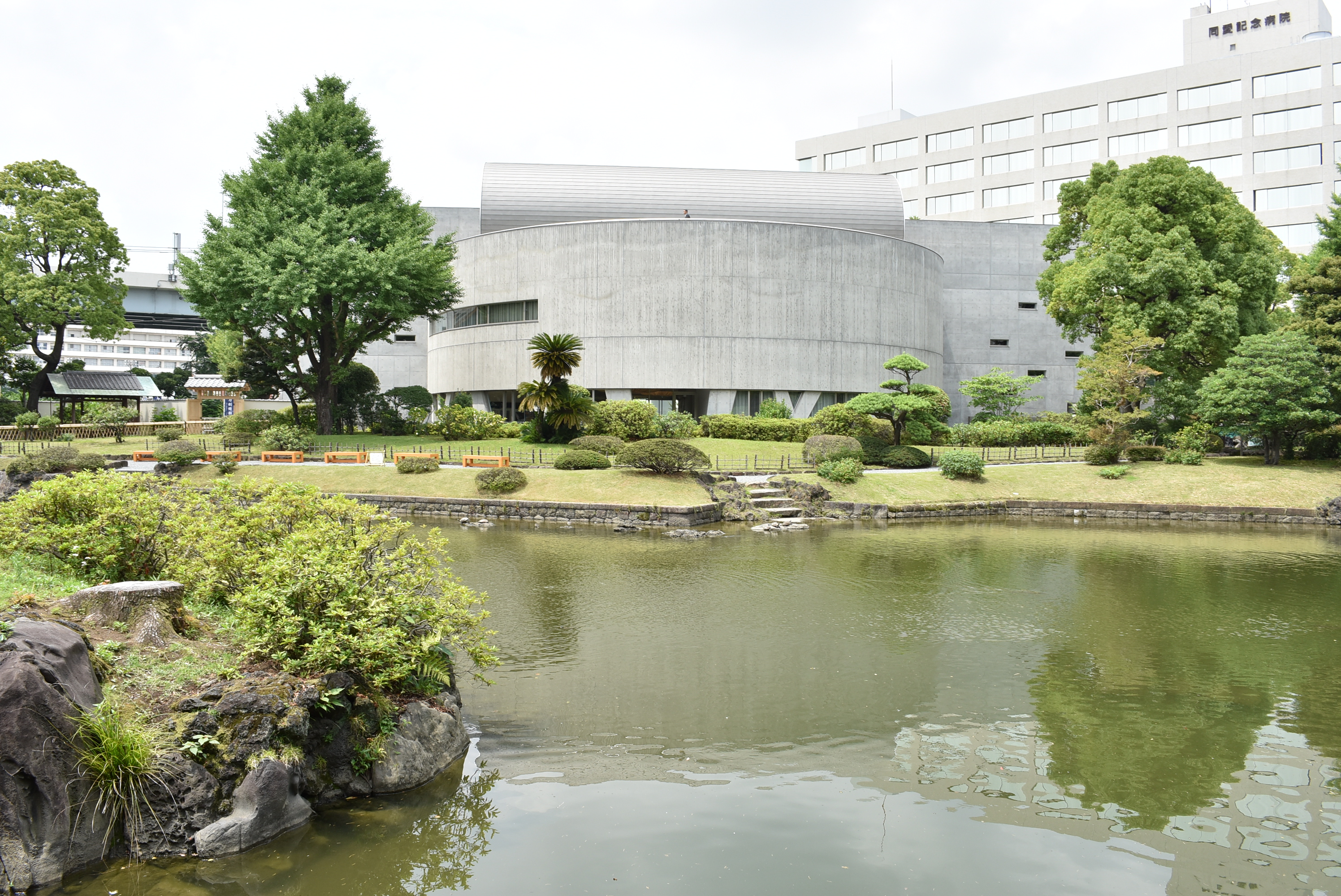
New museum building (2018)

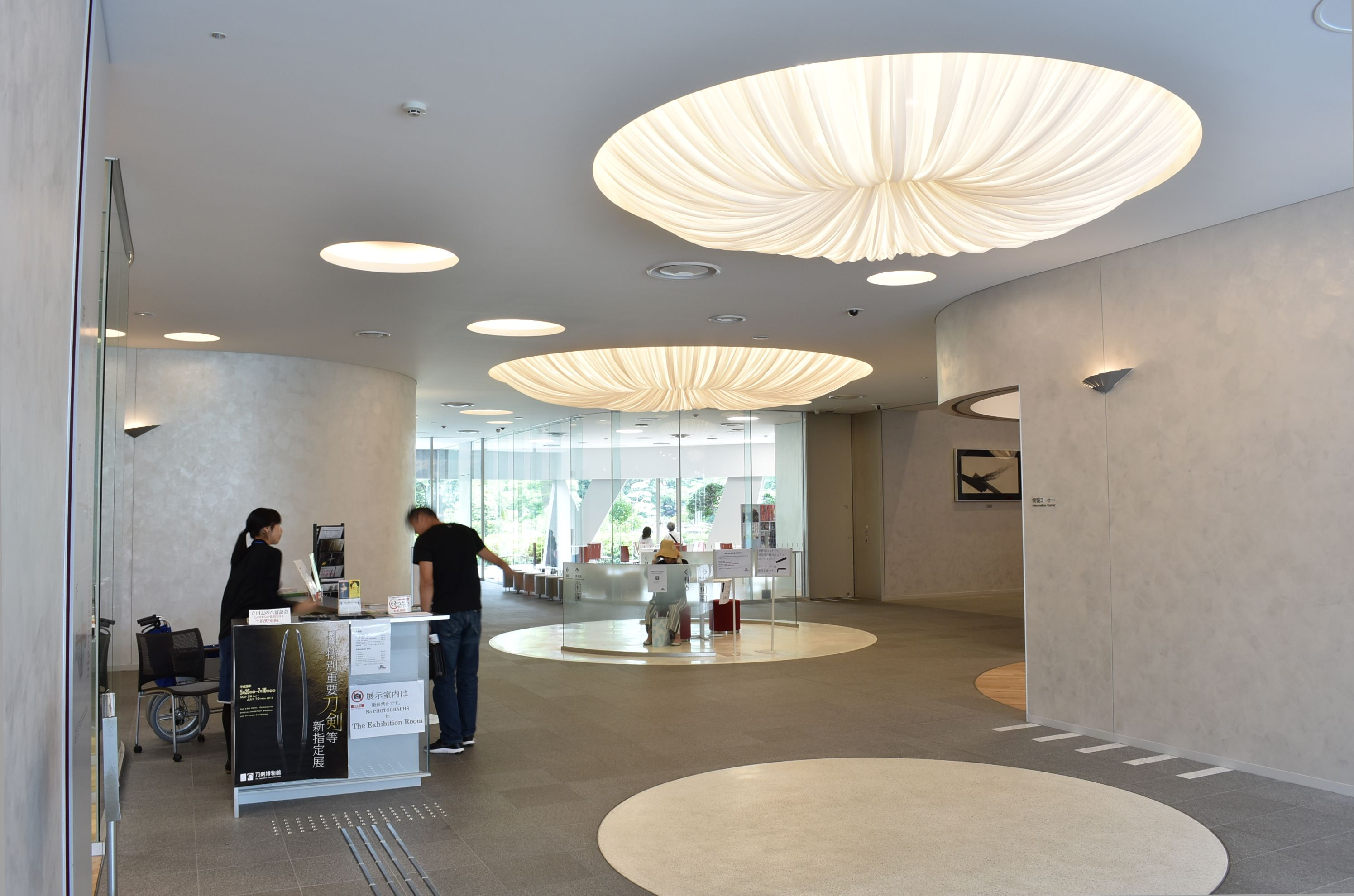
Inside the JSM (2018)

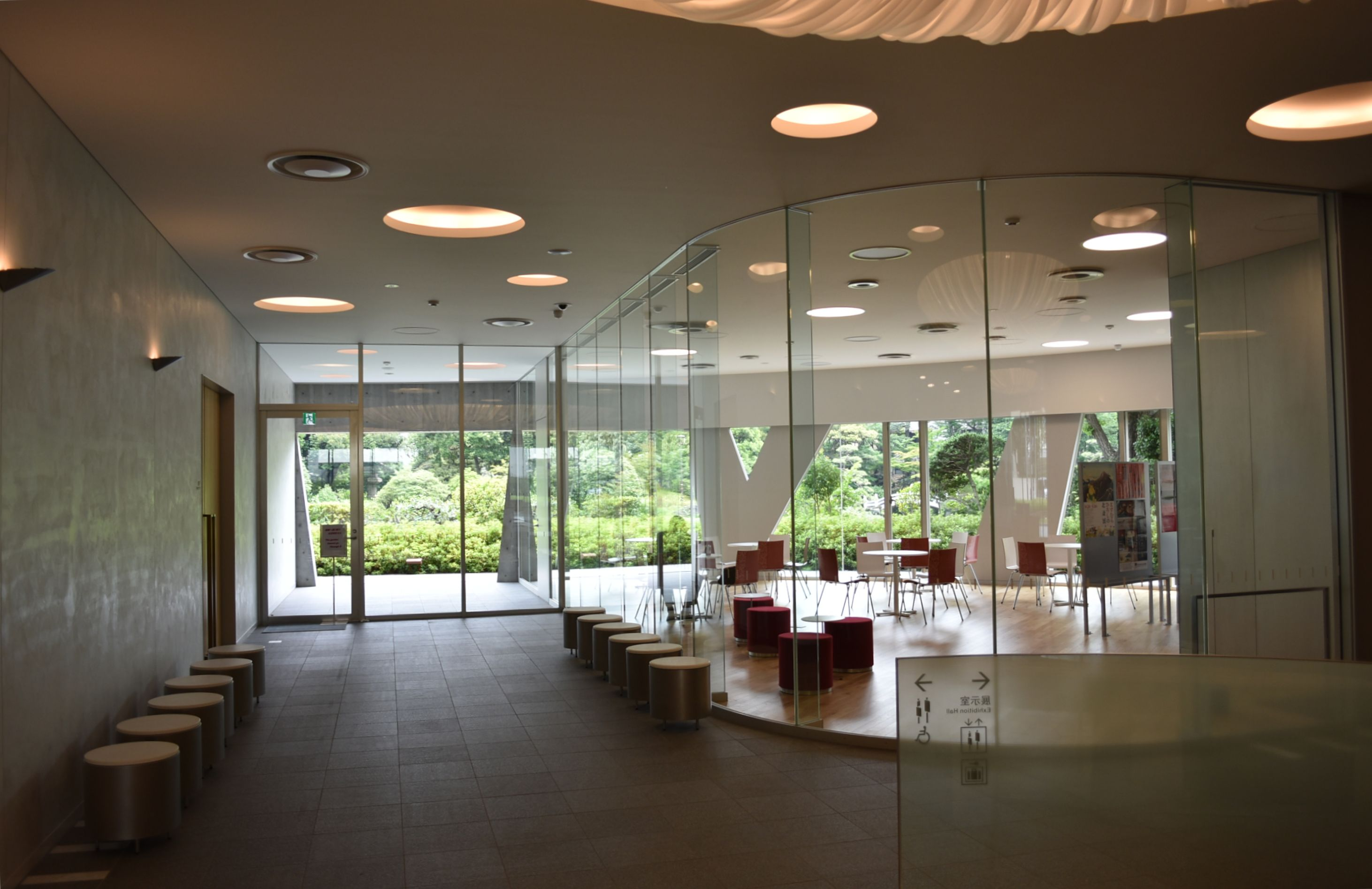
Lobby

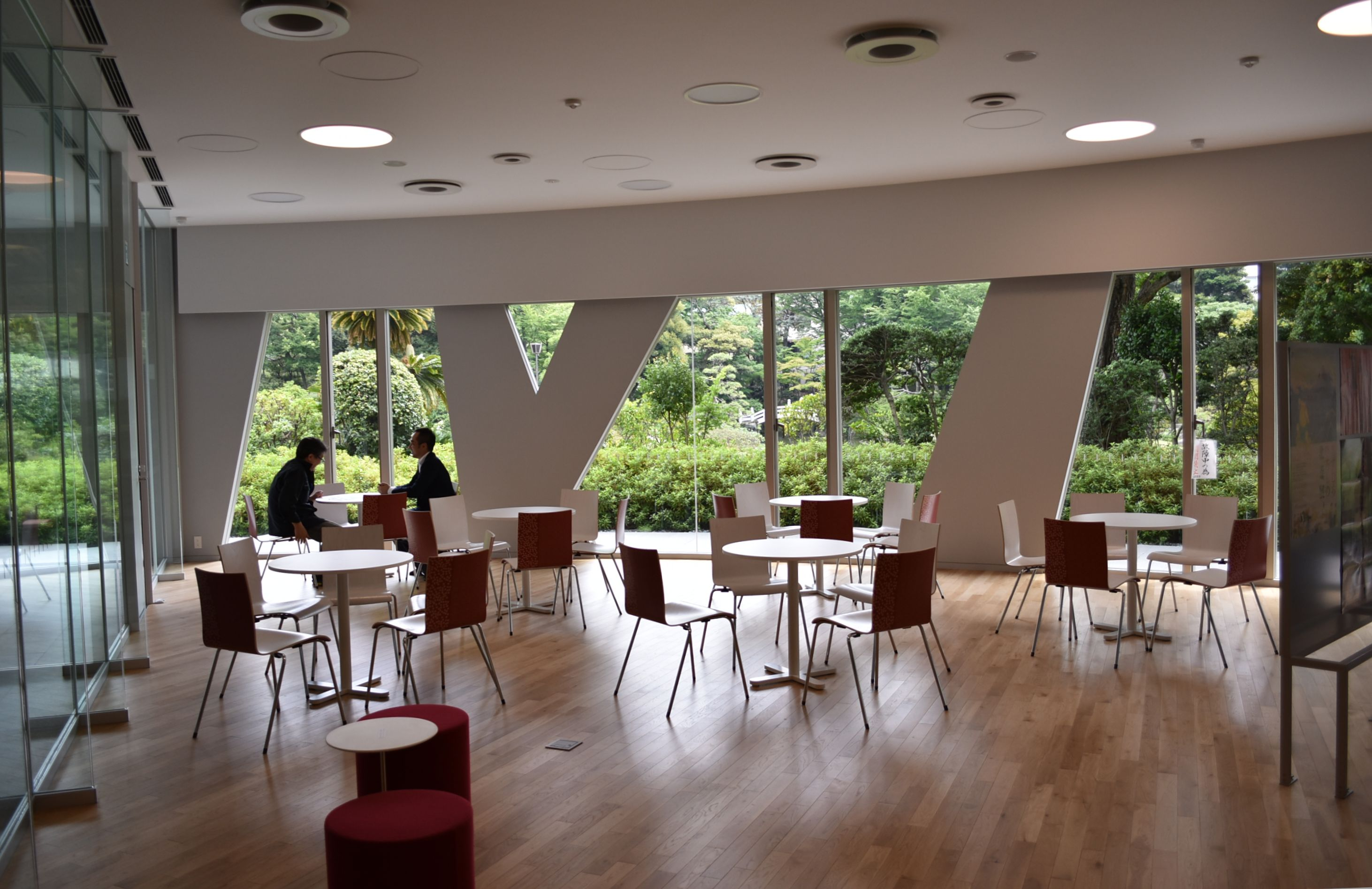
Lobby

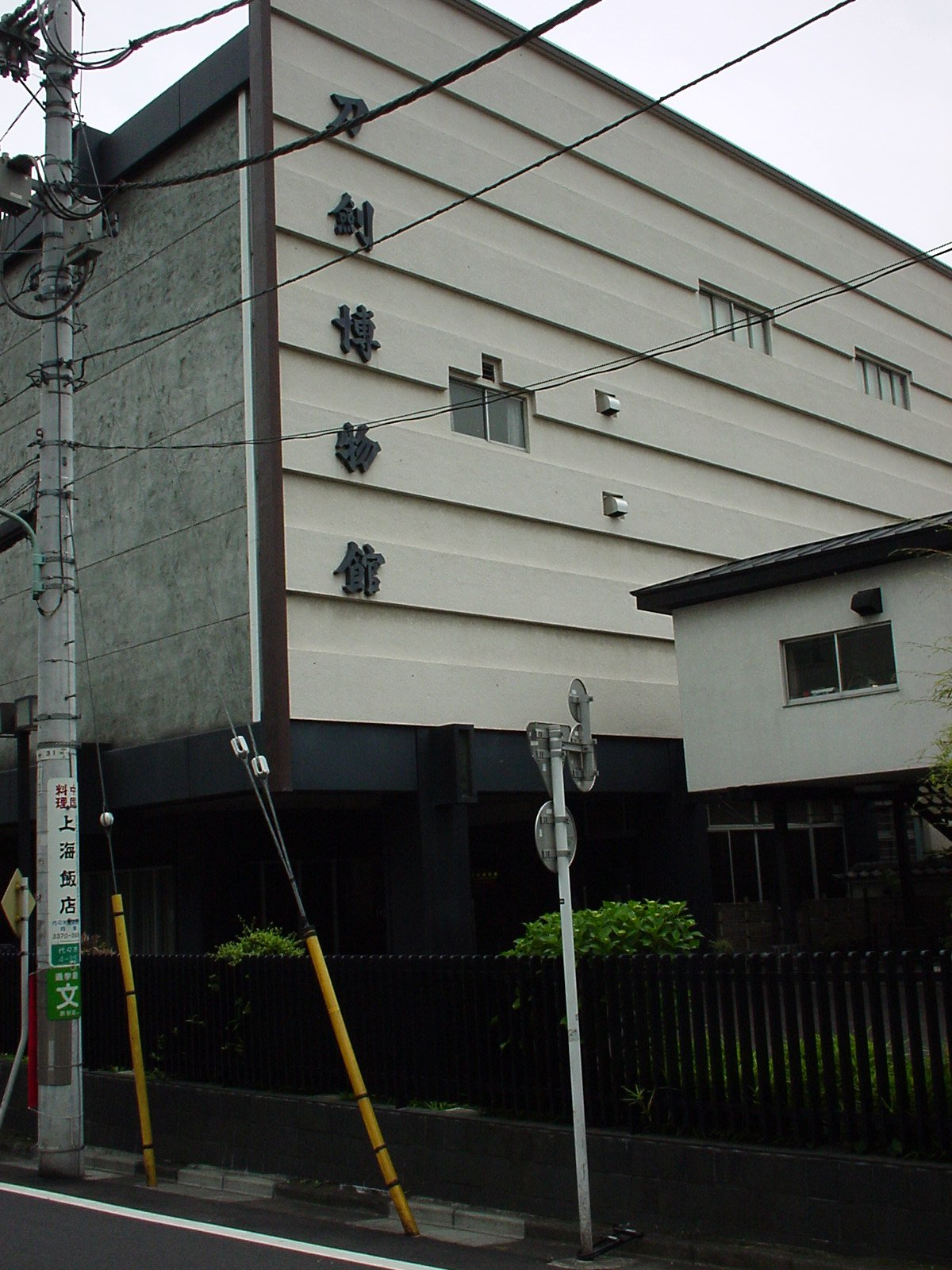
Old Museum Exterior (old location)
