= Okubo Kazuhira =

Okubo Kazuhira (大久保和平) (born Okubo Towazu; 1943–2003) was a Japanese swordsmith.

Towazu's family were not smiths, and he himself developed an interest in forging swords whilst still at school. In 1961, after reading in a newspaper about the smith Miyairi Akihira, he set off alone to locate Akihira and learn about sword-making from him. Towazu travelled to Akahira's hometown of Sakaki, a full day's journey by train from his home in Kanagawa Prefecture, without letting his parents know of his intentions. The newspaper article did not give Akahira's address, and so Kazuhira wandered along the Shinano River until nightfall, when he slept rough. In the morning, he was able to get directions to Akahira's house from a local farmer.

Akahira accepted Towazu as a student. Originally Towazu intended to return to finish his schooling, but Akahira discouraged him, pointing out that a high-school diploma was unnecessary to become a swordsmith. Towazu gained his swordsmith's licence in 1967 and took the smith-name Kazuhira (derived by combining characters from his birth name and his teacher's name).

He returned to his parents' home and set up a smithy there. At the age of 23, he was severely injured when a fragment of a large stone anvil hit him in the face. He was forced to retire from work until fully recuperated.

Over time, Kazuhira moved away from the Shosu style of his teacher, and began to forge swords in the Bizen style. Working in this style, he took first prize at the All Japan Swordsmith Association Awards in 1993 and the NBTHK Chairman's Award in 1995.

After many years of winning awards, Kazuhira was awarded the status of "mukansa" meaning "beyond judgment" in 2000. He died in 2003.
