= Kenzō Kotani =

Japanese swordsmith

Kenzō Kotani (Japanese: 小谷 憲三, Hepburn: Kotani Kenzō) (also known as Yasunori, 7 January 1909 – 1 March 2003) was the last Yasukuni Shrine swordsmith.

== Early history ==
Kotani Kenzo was born on 7 January 1909 as the eldest son of a toolmaker in Kure, Hiroshima Prefecture. In his adolescent years he was apprenticed to his uncle Kajiyama Tokutaro (his mother's brother) who, along with his younger cousin Kajiyama Toshimichi, became sakite (sword assistants). In 1933 they were summoned to Tokyo to work at the Yasukuni Shrine.

The Army and Navy were concerned that the number of swords extant were too few to accommodate the needs of the growing officer corps. With backing from the Household Ministry, the Army Ministry, and the Ministry of Culture, a swordsmithy (the Nihonto Tanrenkai, "Japan sword and forging society") was established on 8 July 1933. Kajiyama Yasutoku and Miyaguchi Yasuhiro were appointed as swordsmiths by Army Minister General Sadao Araki. The kanji 'Yasu' (靖) was taken from the shrine and affixed with a character from their personal names (nanori) to form their sword names. Kotani Kenzo and his cousin Kajiyama Toshimichi were their uncle's assistants.

== Yasukuni Shrine 1933–1945 ==
In 1933, Kotani was summoned, along with his uncle and cousin, to Tokyo from Hiroshima to work at the Yasukuni shrine. On 10 July 1935 Kotani, as the senior sword student (sakite), became the next official Yasukuni Shrine swordsmith and was given the name Yasunori (靖憲) by the Minister of War, Lieutenant General Hayashi Senjuro. From 1935 to 1938 he won more prizes at the shrine than his uncle and other senior swordmakers like Ikeda Yasumistu and Miyaguchi Yasuhiro. During that time, he won eight or nine prizes annually for high quality. He was selected to make swords for officers such as Field Marshal Hisaichi Terauchi and Prince Morihiro Higashikuni

Yasunori used this name throughout his time at the shrine and worked not only the longest but was the most prolific, having produced over 1600 swords during his time there. In 1938, General Nara Taketsugu (奈良武次), aide-de-camp to the Emperor, awarded the character 'Take' (武) from his name to Yasunori, as he had earlier done for Yasunori's uncle, Yasutoku, on 13 September 1934. Their new names Taketoku (武徳) and Takenori (武憲) were to be signed on swords made outside the shrine.

== Working style ==
Swords made by the Kajiyama group strive to emulate the Nagamitsu/Kagemitsu style of the Kamakura period as directed by the Directors of the Nipponto Tanrankai. Swords by this group were done in gunome choji or ko-choji midare style in nioi. Sometimes ara nie can be seen in their work, particularly in that done by Yasunori and his uncle Yasutoku. Yasutoshi (Yasunori's cousin) made his swords truer than both his father in that he made his hamon out of pure nioi. Their Nakago were finished in kurijimomo (Yasutoku) or kurijiri (Yasunori and Yasutoshi) and generally in a gunto sugata of 60–66 cm. However, he sometimes produced special orders with longer lengths like 69–70 cm.

When the war ended in September 1945, crafting gunto at the shrine ceased. Yasunori did not return to swordmaking until 1970 and stopped making swords in 1983.

== See also ==
- Glossary of Japanese swords

== Sources ==
- Fujishiro, Okisato Yasukuni-to, Token Bijutsu, June 1981
- Han, Bing Siong, The Significance of the Yasukuni Shrine in Contemporary Sword History, 1989
