= Nihon Bijutsu Token Hozon Kyokai =

Public interest incorporated foundation

Nihon Bijutsu Tōken Hozon Kyōkai
- 日本美術刀剣保存協会
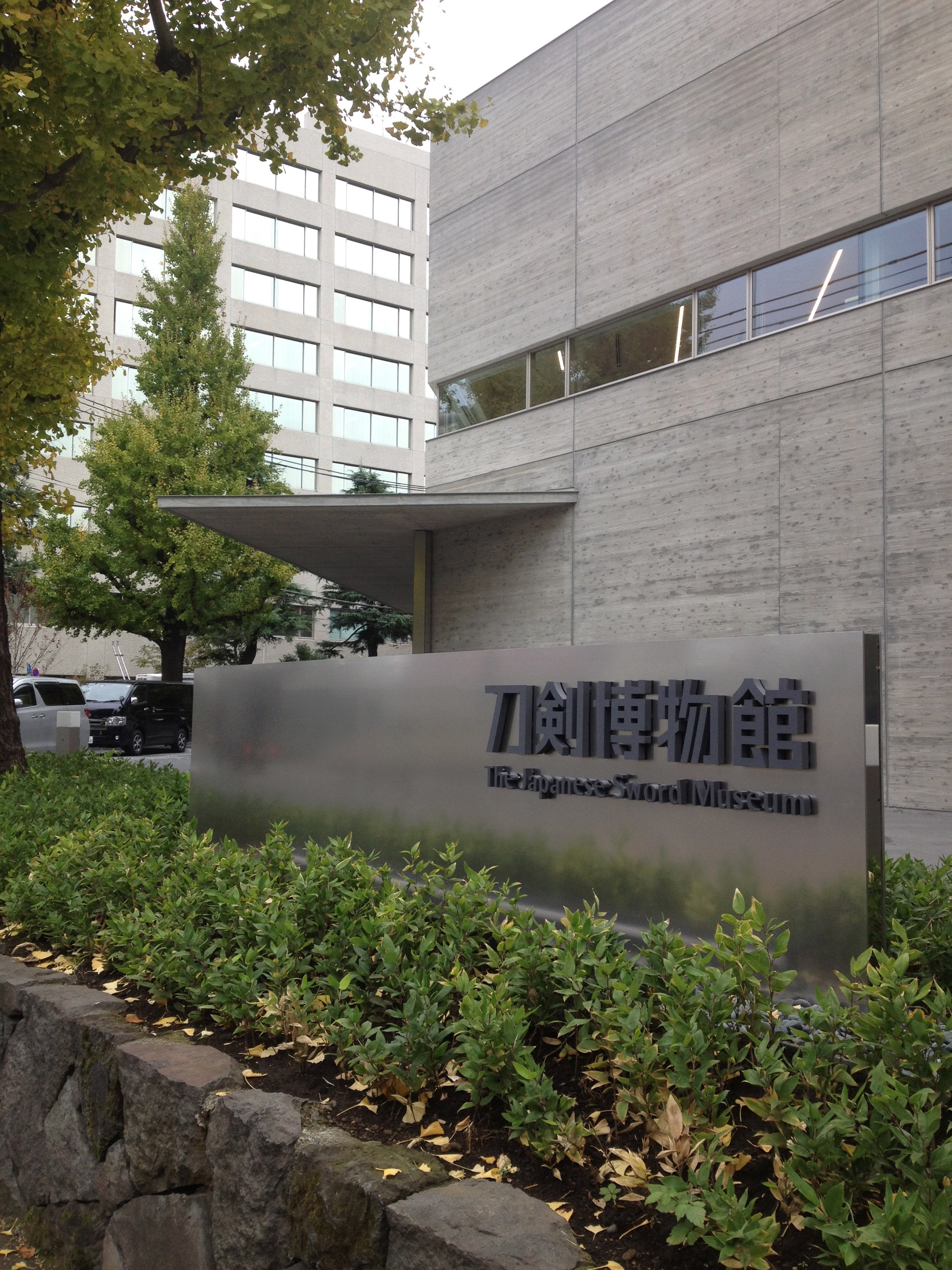
- The Japanese Sword Museum, where the headquarter office of the Foundation is located (Sumida-ku)
- Abbreviation: NBTHK
- Pronunciation: Nihon Bijutsu Tōken Hozon Kyōkai
- Formation: April 1, 2012
- Type: Public Interest Incorporated Foundation
- Registration no.: 6011005003782
- Purpose: Contribution to the preservation of cultural heritage and promotion of Japanese culture.
- Headquarters: Tokyo, Japan
- Location: 1-12-9 Yokoami, Sumida-ku, Tokyo
- Origins: Nihon Bijutsu Tōken Hozon Kyōkai ( February 24, 1948 – March 31, 2012)
- Official language: Japanese
- Chairman and Representative Director: Tadahisa Sakai
- Revenue: 1,602,44,627 yen (March 31, 2016)
- Staff: Directors 18; Trustees 15; Staffs 28 (October 1, 2021)
- Website: http://www.touken.or.jp/

The Nihon Bijutsu Tōken Hozon Kyōkai (日本美術刀剣保存協会; 'The Society for Preservation of Japanese Art Swords', NBTHK) is a public interest incorporated foundation established in February 1948 to preserve and promote Japanese swords that have artistic value. They run a Japanese Sword Museum in Tokyo and have a secretariat in the building.

== History ==
After the Meiji Restoration and the Swords Abolishment Edict (廃刀令, Haitōrei), a major concern grew that the swords would be lost overseas. Although Japanese sword making was an abandoned practice, it was revived in the 4th Imperial exhibition in 1934. The Nihonto Tanren Renshu Jo (lit. 'Japanese swordsmithing training center') led by Kurihara Hikosaburō discovered 82 swordsmiths from the local area and supported them.

After the end of World War II, the General Headquarters of the Supreme Commander for the Allied Powers confiscated Japanese swords. However, swords that were deemed "household treasures" were excluded from the confiscation.

The "Prohibition of possession of firearms" (Emperor's Decree No. 300) was promulgated, and the prohibition of "swords and valuable items as art" was excluded on June 1, 1946.

The Japanese government designated 17 swords as important works of art.

Volunteers established the Foundation on February 24, 1948, to pass Japanese swords on to future generations. The team was led by Junji Homma and Kan'ichi Sato, who at the time were a leading Japanese sword researcher and director of the swords department of the Tokyo National Museum respectively.

Initially, the headquarter office was located at the Tokyo National Museum in Ueno, Taitō, Tokyo, Japan.

The National Museum (currently Tokyo National Museum) held the "Sword Art Special Exhibition" in May 1948 as an exhibition of swords as works of art. In the same year, the association started a certification system for swords. In addition, the 1st presentation of sword polishing production technology was held.

The association has published a specialized magazine, "Sword Art", since 1949. The magazine presents commentaries with images of famous swords and sword tools. A question was presented as a "paper appraisal" showing the Oshigata of the Hamon (刃文の押形), and the correct answer is explained in the next issue.

In 1955, the first sword technology presentation was held at the Tokyo Metropolitan Art Museum and thereafter.

In 1968, the association moved the office to Yoyogi, Shibuya-ku, Tokyo, and opened the Japanese Sword Museum with the funds raised by the members, to exhibit the saved and preserved swords.

In 1976, in order to secure sword-making materials that would become increasingly difficult to obtain, the Nittoho Tatara Plant was established to produce wako (Japanese steel for blades) and tamahagane (High-quality blade steel), in Okuizumo town, Shimane Prefecture.

In 1977, the Nittoho Tatara Plant was revived in Yokota Town, Shimane Prefecture.

On April 1, 2012, NBTHK was certified as a "public interest incorporated foundation" (公益財団法人) by the Cabinet Office of the Japanese government (see history) by contributing "Sword Appraisal" to the public interest business.

In 2017, the Japanese Sword Museum moved to Kuramae and relocated to a new building.

== Shinsa (grading examination) ==
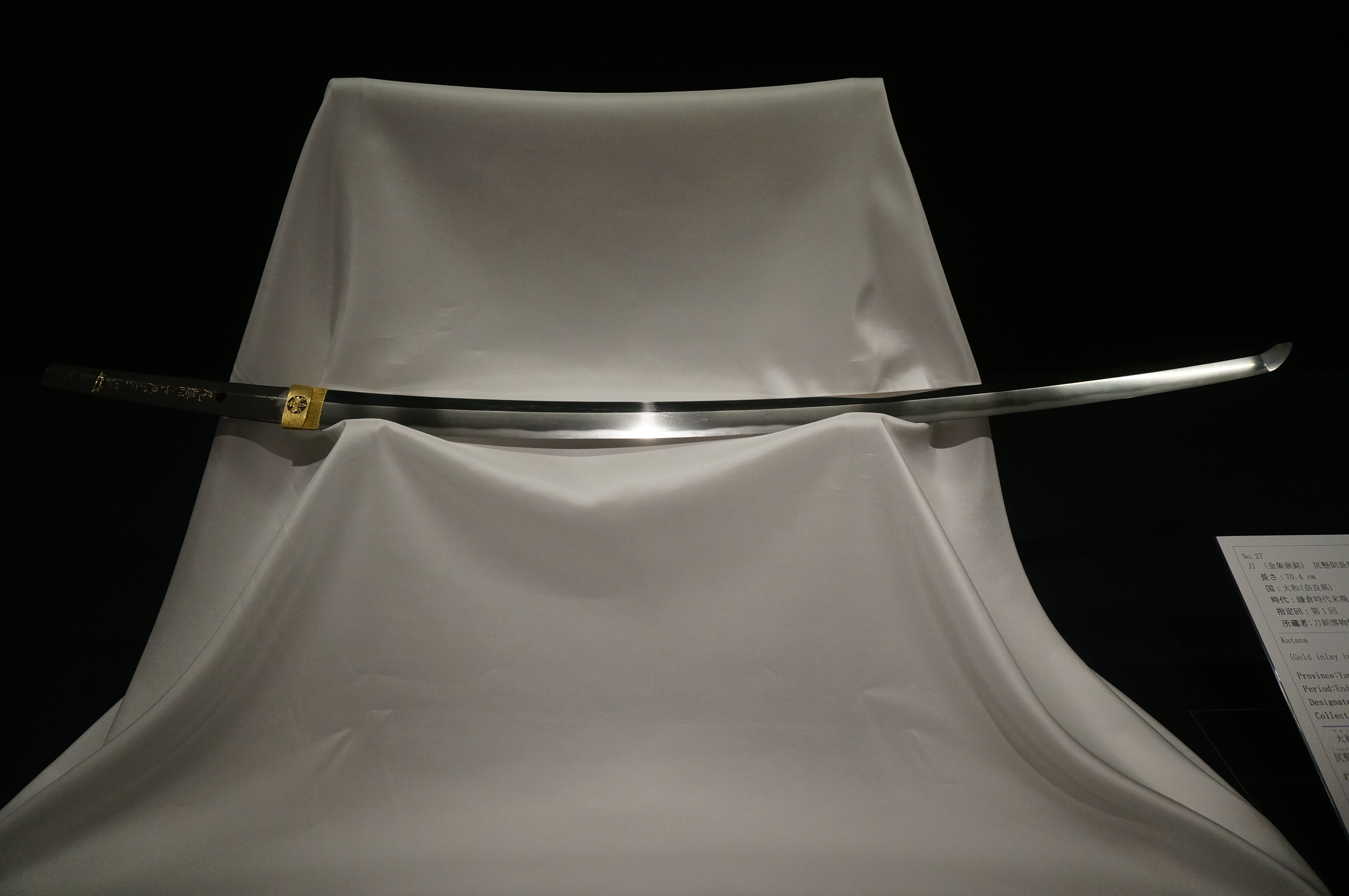
A katana modified from a tachi forged by Shikkake Norinaga, Kamakura period. A Japanese sword first designated as a Tokubetsu Juyo Token (Special Important Sword) by the NBTHK.

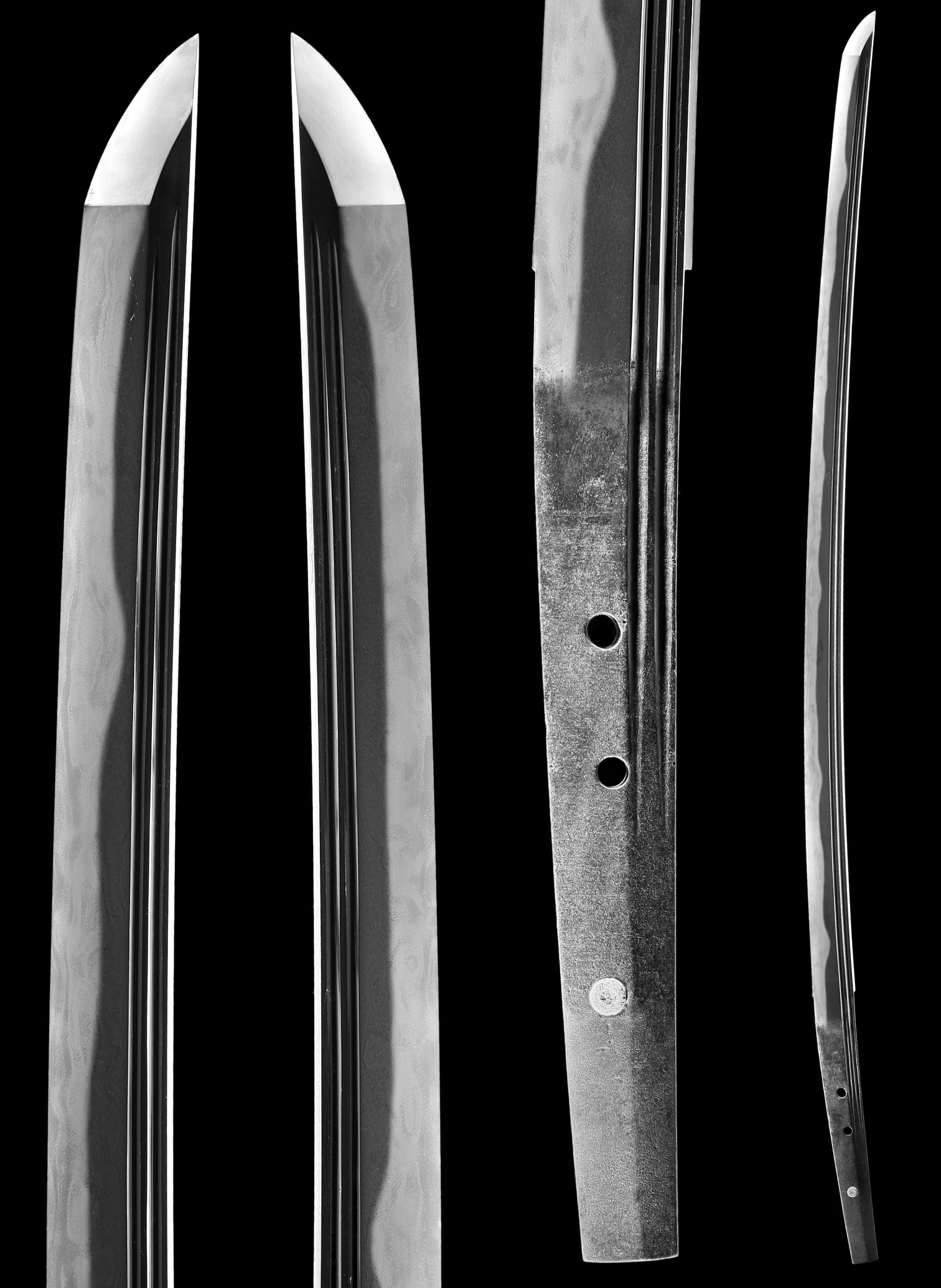
A Soshu school katana attributed to Etchu Norishige and ranked Tokubetsu Juyo Token by the NBTHK.

=== Shinsa ===
Nihon Bijutsu Token Hozon Kyokai evaluates Japanese swords and sword mountings requested by their owners, and assigns grades to those with superior artistic and historical values. Depending on the quality and the state of preservation, it may fail and a grade may not be given. Their ratings are an important indicator of the artistic value and monetary value of Japanese swords.

According to the current appraisal system from 1982, high-value swords and sword mountings are classified into 4 grades from the top: Tokubetsu Juyo (Special Important), Juyo (Important), Tokubetsu Hozon (Special Preservation), and Hozon (Preservation). They publish the achievement conditions for each grade in Japanese.

Tokubetsu Juyo Token (Special Important swords) are equivalent to the value of Juyo Bunkazai (Important Cultural Properties) and Juyo Bijutsuhin (Important Art Objects) designated by the Japanese government, and Juyo Token (Important Swords) are equivalent to the value of Juyo Bijutsuhin. As of 2021, only 1143 swords, 59 scabbards and hilts, and 80 sword fittings were ranked in the highest class with Tokubetsu Juyo (Special Important).

It is desirable for the owner of a sword with a Koshu Tokubetsu Kicho, Tokubetsu Kicho and Kicho grade, which were rated under the previous appraisal system before 1982, to re-evaluate the sword under the current system, because the grade has already lost its validity as an appraisal.

=== Issues with shinsa ===
Today, appraisal is almost monopolized by the NBTHK, which is a public interest corporation certified by the government. In the answer from Bunmei Ibuki, the Minister of Education, Culture, Sports, Science and Technology, said the "(NBTHK is) appraisal agency that there is only one".

In 1981, many certified swords, such as "Tokubetsu Kicho Token" (Special Valuable Swords), were discovered to be fake. The board of directors took the following measures in September: the chairman and all directors resigned, the sword certification system was reviewed, and alleged judges were removed. As a result, the system for appraisal was changed from the conventional system for sword approval in 1982.

In 2006, issues with shinsa (grading examination) became a problem in the House of Representatives. The Department of Education, Culture, Sports, Science and Technology ordered an investigation and instructed to ensure the fairness of the examination. NBTHK answered that the board members and their family members and examiners were not allowed to submit the examination. After that, the association applied for a sword examination that violated the resolution for improvement measures by the Agency for Cultural Affairs. Representative Hosaka Nobuto raised a subject at the Culture and Science Committee at the 165th national diet on 20 October 2006. In 2007, Representative Sasaki Kensho asked about examination application from board-members or non-members and unfair relation with specific dealers, etc. Prime Minister Shinzo Abe submitted a response that included circumstances of the question to the chair of the House of Representatives. There were 344 cases of regulatory violations such as submitting examinations from board members, their families, and from non-members since the 2006 report. NBTHK announced self-restraint of submissions from board members, their families, staff members and examiners, and would be supervised by the Agency of Cultural Affairs.

== Modern sword and craft competition (Gendai Tōshoku Ten) ==
The NBTHK is the organizer of the Gendai Tōshoku Ten (Japanese: 現代刀職展; formerly Shinsaku Meito Ten), a competition of modern Japanese swords. The competition consists of sword forging, horimono (blade carving), metal work, sword polishing, shirasaya (storage scabbard), toso (scabbard), tsukamaki (hilt wrapping) and habaki (blade collar) divisions, and awards are given in each division. The sword forging division is divided into the tachi, katana, wakizashi, naginata, and yari division and the tantō and tsurugi division, and the sword polishing division is divided into the shinogi-zukuri division and hira-zukuri division. Swordsmiths and craftsmen can exhibit only one work in each division. In the awards lower than the NBTHK's President Award except for the Newcomer Award, several people are awarded and ranked within each award.

A swordsmith who wins each prize multiple times (eight times including two Takamatsu-no-Miya Awards, or ten Tokushō awards) is given the title of Mukansa (無鑑査) and is considered to be one of the best modern smiths. From 1958 to 2019, only 39 people were selected as Mukansa. In principle, swords forged by Mukansa are not eligible for awards. The Masamune Award is only given when an outstanding sword made by a Mukansa smith is submitted. Most recently, the Masamune Award was given to Amata Akitsugu in 1996, Norihiro Miyairi in 2010 for a tantō, and Kunihira Kawachi in 2014 for a tachi.

- Masamune-shō (Masamune Award) － only Mukansa
- Tokushō (Special prize)

- Takamatsu-no-Miya (Prince Takamatsu) Memorial Award － only sword forging division
- Minister of Education, Culture, Sports, Science and Technology Award －only sword polishing division
- Kiya Award －only sword polishing division
- Takeya Award － only sword polishing division
- Chiba Award － only sword polishing division
- Kunzan (Junji Honma) Award
- Kanzan (Kanichi Sato) Award
- The NBTHK's President Award

- Yūshū-shō (Excellence Award)
- Doryoku-shō (Great effort Award)
- Shinjin-shō (Newcomer Award)
- Nyūsen
