= Kogarasu Maru =

Japanese sword

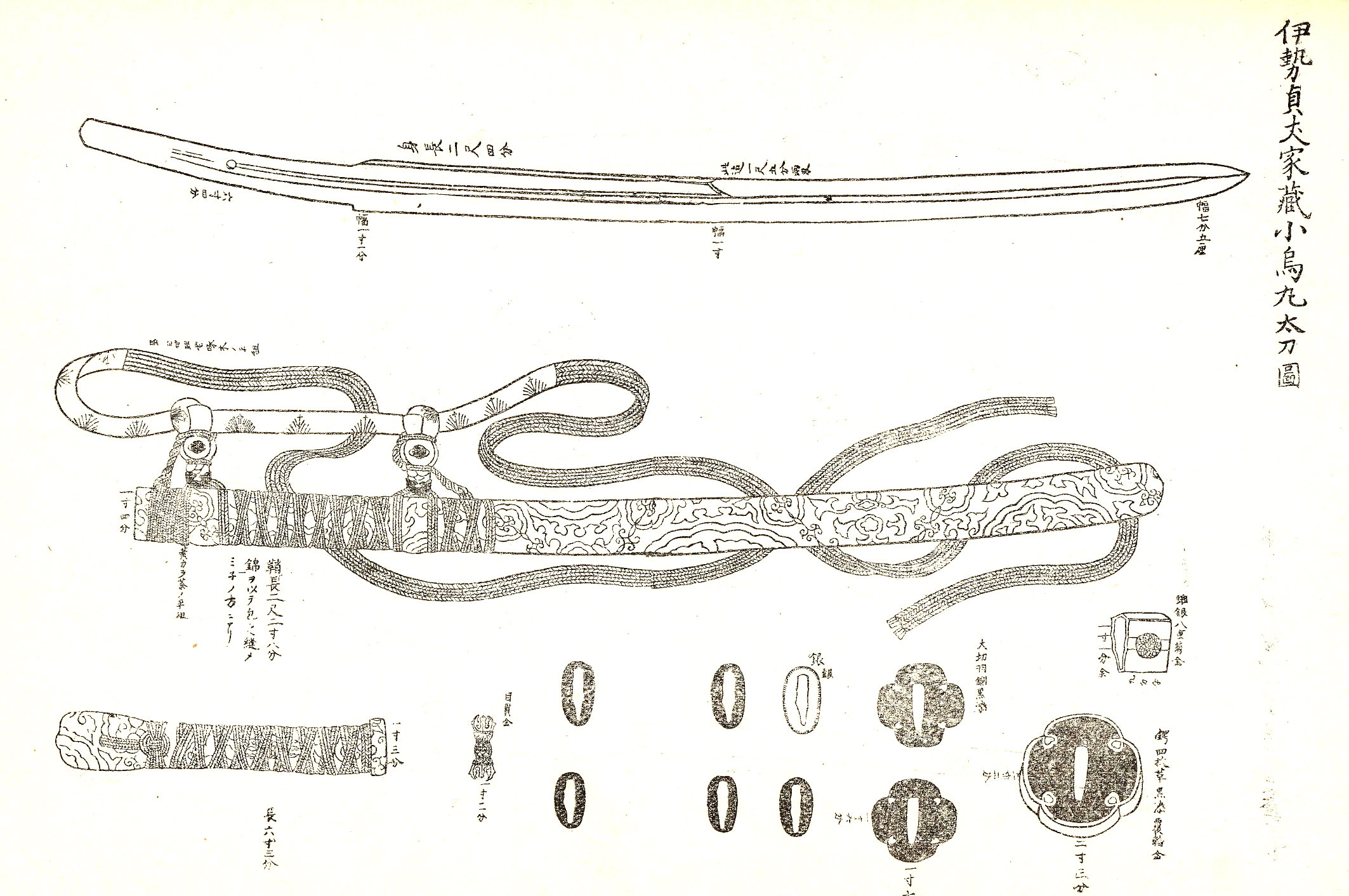
Kogarasu Maru and Koshirae

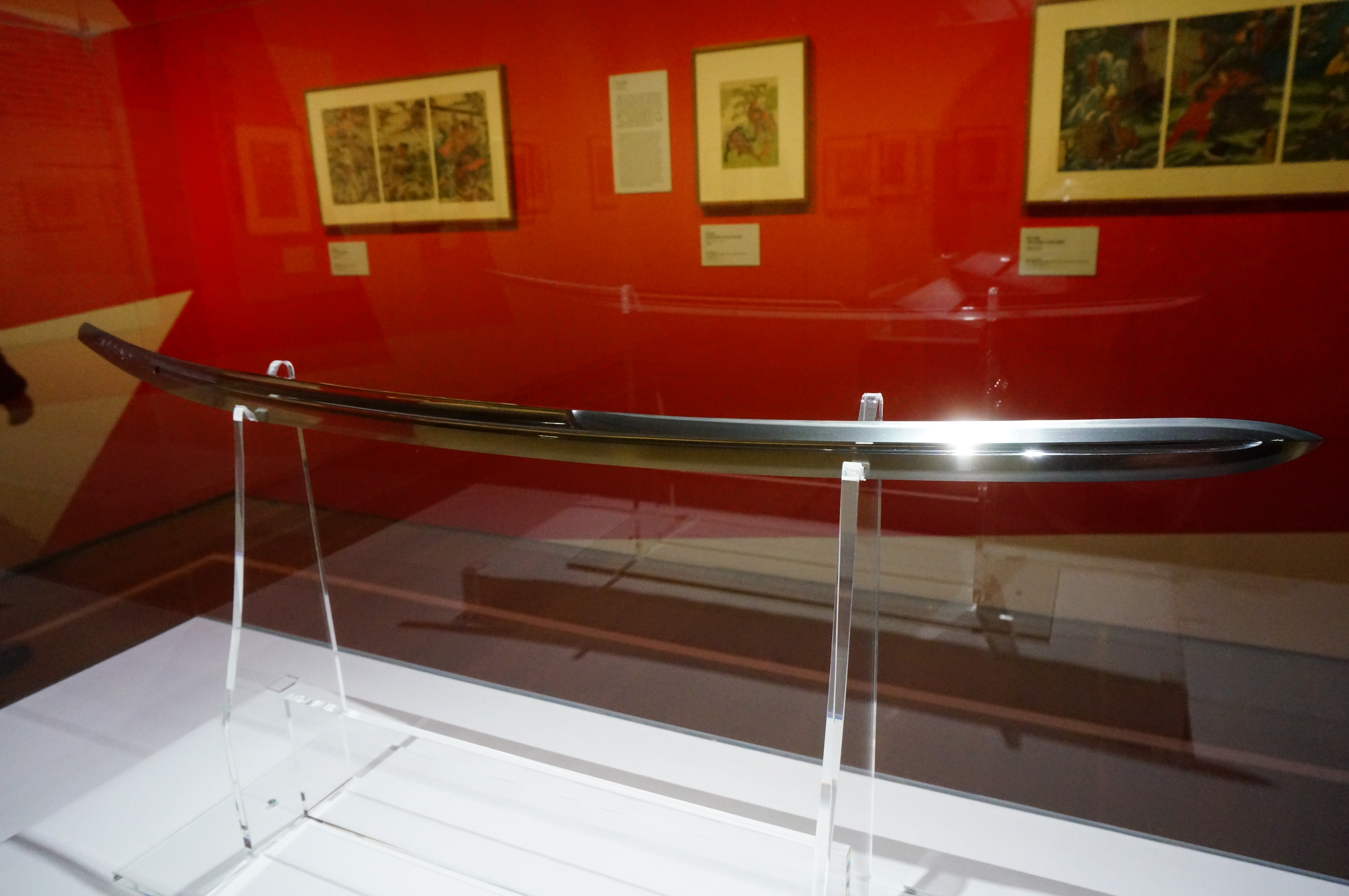
Replica of the tachi Kogarasu Maru, Ozawa Masatoshi, 1970.

The Kogarasu Maru (小烏丸), or "Little Crow Circle", is a unique Japanese tachi sword believed to have been created by legendary Japanese smith Amakuni during the 8th century AD.

== Blade classification and history ==
Kissaki Moroha Zukuri (鋒両刃造) blades like the Kogarasu Maru are sometimes referred to as Kogarasu Zukuri (小烏造), since the blade of the Kogarasu Maru is shaped this way and is well known for its distinctive sugata. The Kogarasu Maru is unique as a bridge between the old double-edged Japanese ken (based on the Chinese jian) and the traditional Japanese tachi and eventual katana.

The Kogarasu Maru was designed with a curved double-edged blade approximately 62.8 cm long. One edge of the blade is shaped in normal tachi fashion but, unlike the tachi, the tip is symmetrical and both edges of the blade are sharp, except for about 20 cm of the trailing or concave edge nearest the hilt, which is rounded. A single koshi-hi (腰樋) style groove runs from the tang to the transition point where the blade becomes double-edged, and is invariably accompanied by a soe-hi (添樋). The hardening process yielded a straight temper line (sugaha hamon, 直刃刃文) on both sides of the blade.

The Kogarasu Maru is currently in the Japanese Imperial Collection. The tang of the Kogarasu Maru is not signed but the blade is believed to have been made in either the early Heian period or late Nara period, by the swordsmith Amakuni, who is said to have created the first curved Japanese sword and is believed to have lived during this period. Two other Kogarasu Zukuri blades exist from this era, but many other blades of this type have been created throughout Japanese history.

Murata Tsuneyoshi, a General of the Imperial Japanese Army during the Meiji era, created the first Gunto, famously known as Murata-To which is a Kissaki Moroha Zukuri style double edged Katana.

== In popular culture ==
Though rare, Kissaki Moroha Zukuri style Katanas have also been featured in Japanese novels, manga and anime.

- In Arifureta: From Commonplace to World's Strongest light novel series, the main protagonist Hajime Nagumo crafted a black Shirasaya Katana with a double edged black blade named Tsumehirameki, its design resembling Kogarasu Maru.
- In Toji no Miko, Juujou Hiyori has an okatana named Kogarasumaru and it also has the same design as the original Kogarasumaru.
- In Highschool of the Dead, Saeko Busujima received a Meiji era Gunto named Murata-Tou which is a Kogarasu Zukuri style Gunto made by Murata Tsuneyoshi in the Tokyo Armory.
- In Sekiro: Shadows Die Twice, the black Mortal Blade acquired by Genichiro Ashina is a double edged katana in this style.
- A Storm Rider team from Air Gear was named after this sword.
- In the video game Nioh, players can acquire Kogarasu Maru as a weapon.
- In Samurai Champloo, Mugen wields a sword strikingly similar to this blade.
- An anthropomorphized version of Kogarasumaru appears in the browser game Touken Ranbu.
