= Differential heat treatment =

Technique used in heat treating

Differential heat treatment (also called selective heat treatment or local heat treatment) is a technique used during heat treating of steel to harden or soften certain areas of an object, creating a difference in hardness between these areas. There are many techniques for creating a difference in properties, but most can be defined as either differential hardening or differential tempering. These were common heat treatment techniques used historically in Europe and Asia, with possibly the most widely known example being from Japanese swordsmithing. Some modern varieties were developed in the twentieth century as metallurgical knowledge and technology rapidly increased.

Differential hardening is done by either of two methods. One of them is heating the steel evenly to a red-hot temperature and then cooling part of it quickly, turning that part into very hard martensite while the rest cools more slowly and becomes softer pearlite. The other is heating only part of the steel very quickly to red-hot and then rapidly cooling it by quenching, again turning that part into martensite, but leaving the rest unchanged. Conversely, one may selectively harden steel by differential tempering, that is, by heating it evenly to red-hot and then quenching it, turning it into martensite, and then tempering part of it by heating it to a much lower temperature, softening only that part.

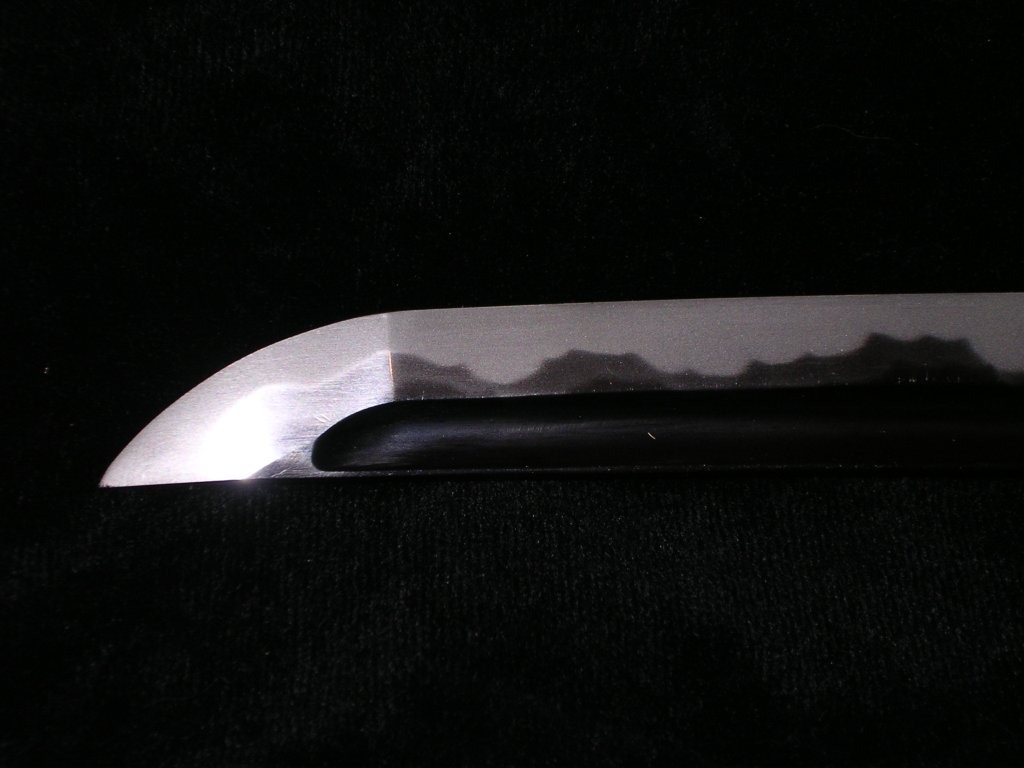
A differentially hardened sword, showing the hardened edge as the whiter portion of the blade.

== Introduction ==
Differential heat treatment is a method used to alter the properties of various parts of a steel object differently, producing areas that are harder or softer than others. This creates greater toughness in the parts of the object where it is needed, such as the tang or spine of a sword, but produces greater hardness at the edge or other areas where greater impact resistance, wear resistance, and strength is needed. Differential heat treatment can often make certain areas harder than could be allowed if the steel was uniformly treated, or "through treated". There are several techniques used to differentially heat treat steel, but they can usually be divided into differential hardening and differential tempering methods.

During heat treating, when red-hot steel (usually between 1,500 °F (820 °C) and 1,600 °F (870 °C)) is quenched, it becomes very hard. However, it will be too hard, becoming very brittle like glass. Quenched-steel is usually heated again, slowly and evenly (usually between 400 °F (204 °C) and 650 °F (343 °C)) in a process called tempering, to soften the metal, thereby increasing the toughness. However, although this softening of the metal makes the blade less prone to breaking, it makes the edge more susceptible to deformation such as dulling, peening, or curling.

Differential hardening is a method used in heat treating swords and knives to increase the hardness of the edge without making the whole blade brittle. To achieve this, the edge is cooled faster than the spine by adding a heat insulator to the spine before quenching. Clay or another material is used for insulation. To prevent cracking and loss of surface carbon, quenching is usually performed before beveling, shaping, and sharpening the edge. It can also be achieved by carefully pouring water (perhaps already heated) onto the edge of a blade as is the case with the manufacture of some kukri. Differential hardening technology originated in China and later spread to Korea and Japan. This technique is mainly used in later Chinese jian, Chinese dao, and the katana, the traditional Japanese sword, and the khukuri, the traditional Nepalese knife. Most blades made with this technique have visible temper lines. Earlier Chinese jian from the ancient era (eg. Warring States to Han dynasty) used tempering rather than differential heat treatment. This method is sometimes called differential tempering, but this term more accurately refers to a different technique, which originated with the broadswords of Europe.

Modern versions of differential hardening were developed when sources of rapidly heating the metal were devised, such as an oxy-acetylene torch or induction heating. With flame hardening and induction hardening techniques, the steel is quickly heated to red-hot in a localized area and then quenched. This hardens only part of the object, but leaves the rest unaltered.

Differential tempering was more commonly used to make cutting tools, although it was sometimes used on knives and swords as well. Differential tempering is obtained by quenching the sword uniformly, then tempering one part of it, such as the spine or the center portion of double edged blades. This is usually done with a torch or some other directed heat source. The heated portion of the metal is softened by this process, leaving the edge at the higher hardness.

== Differential hardening ==
=== Bladesmithing ===
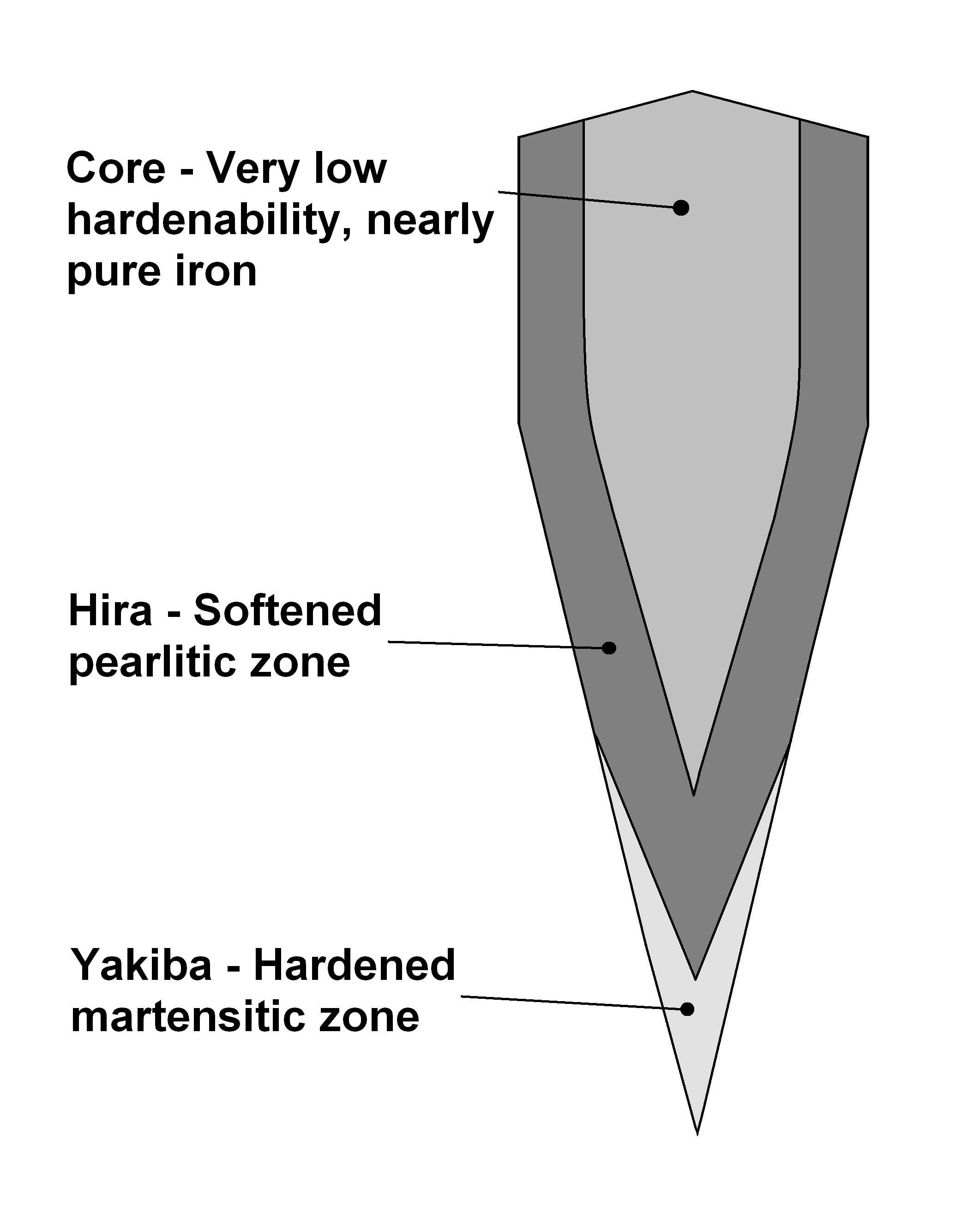
Diagram of a cross section of a katana, showing the typical arrangement of the harder and softer zones.

Differential hardening (also called differential quenching, selective quenching, selective hardening, or local hardening) is most commonly used in bladesmithing to increase the toughness of a blade while keeping very high hardness and strength at the edge. This helps to make the blade very resistant to breaking, by making the spine very soft and bendable, but allows greater hardness at the edge than would be possible if the blade was uniformly quenched and tempered. This helps to create a tough blade that will maintain a very sharp, wear-resistant edge, even during rough use such as found in combat.

==== Insulation coatings ====
A differentially hardened blade will usually be coated with an insulating layer, like clay, but leaving the edge exposed. When it is heated to red-hot and quenched, the edge cools quickly, becoming very hard, but the rest cools slowly, becoming much softer. The insulation layer is quite often a mixture of clays, ashes, polishing stone powder, and salts, which protects the back of the blade from cooling very quickly when quenched. The clay is often applied by painting it on, coating the blade very thickly around the center and spine, but leaving the edge exposed. This allows the edge to cool very quickly, turning it into a very hard microstructure called martensite, but causes the rest of the blade to cool slowly, turning it into a soft microstructure called pearlite. This produces an edge that is exceptionally hard and brittle, but is backed-up by softer, tougher metal. The edge, however, will usually be too hard, so after quenching the entire blade is usually tempered to around 400 °F (204 °C) for a short time, to bring the hardness of the edge down to around HRc60 on the Rockwell hardness scale.

The exact composition of the clay mixture, the thickness of the coating, and even the temperature of the water were often closely guarded secrets of the various bladesmithing schools. With the clay mixture, the main goal was to find a mixture that would withstand high temperatures and adhere to the blade without shrinking, cracking, or peeling as it dried. Sometimes the back of the blade was coated with clay, leaving the edge exposed. Other times the entire blade was coated and then the clay was cut away from the edge. Another method was to apply the clay thickly at the back but thinly at the edge, providing a lesser amount of insulation. By controlling the thickness of the edge-coating along with the temperature of the water, the cooling rate of each part of the blade can be controlled to produce the proper hardness upon quenching without the need for further tempering.

==== Quenching ====
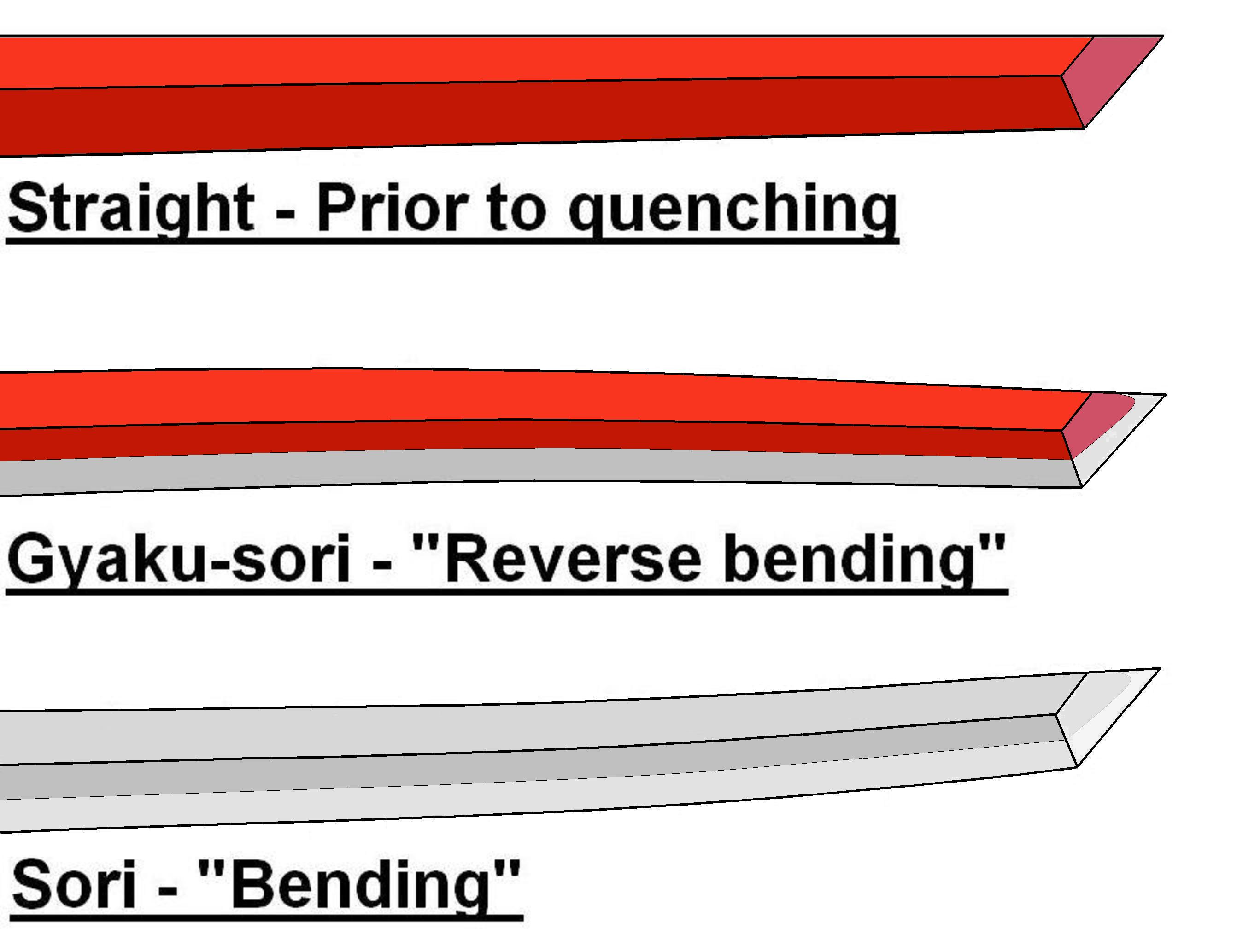
The curving of a katana during quenching first begins with a downward bend as the edge cools, followed by an upward bend as the rest of the sword cools.

Once the coating has dried, the blade is heated slowly and evenly, to prevent the coating from cracking or falling off. After the blade is heated to the proper temperature, which is usually judged by the cherry-red glow (blackbody radiation) of the blade, it will change into a phase called austenite. Both to help prevent cracking and to produce uniformity in the hardness of each area, the smith will need to ensure that the temperature is even, lacking any hot spots from sitting next to the coals. To prevent this, the blade is usually kept in motion while heating, to distribute the heat more evenly. Quenching is often done in low-light conditions, to help accurately judge the color of the glow. Typically, the smith will also try to avoid overheating the blade to prevent the metallic crystals from growing too large. At this time the blade will usually be plunged into a vat of water or oil, to quickly remove the heat from the edge. The clay, in turn, insulates the back of the blade, causing it to cool slower than the edge.

When the edge cools fast a diffusionless transformation occurs, turning the austenite into very hard martensite. This requires a temperature drop from around 750 °C (cherry-red) to 450 °C (at which point the transformation is complete) in less than a second to prevent the formation of soft pearlite. Because the rest of the blade cools slowly, the carbon in the austenite has time to precipitate, becoming pearlite. The diffusionless transformation causes the edge to "freeze" suddenly in a thermally expanded state, but allows the back to contract as it cools slower. This typically causes the blade to bend or curve during quenching, as the back contracts more than the edge. This gives swords like katana and wakizashi their characteristic curved shapes. The blade is usually straight when heated but then bows as it cools; first curving toward the edge as it contracts, and then away from the edge as the spine contracts more. With slashing-type swords, this curvature helps to facilitate cutting, but increases the chances of cracking during the procedure. Up to one third of all swords are ruined during the quenching process. However, when the sword does not crack, the internal stresses created help increase the toughness of the blade, similar to the increased toughness in tempered glass. The sword may need further shaping after quenching and tempering, to achieve the desired curvature.

Care must be taken to plunge the sword quickly and vertically (edge first), for if one side enters the quenching fluid before the other the cooling may be asymmetric and cause the blade to bend sideways (warp). Because quenching in water tends to cause a sudden loss of surface carbon, the sword will usually be quenched before the edge is beveled and sharpened. After quenching and tempering, the blade was traditionally given a rough shape with a metal-cutting draw knife (sen) before sending to a polisher for sharpening, although in modern times an electric belt sander is often used instead.

==== Metallography ====
Differential hardening will produce two different zones of hardness, which respond differently to grinding, sharpening, and polishing. The back and center of the blade will grind away much quicker than the edge, so the polisher will need to carefully control the angle of the edge, which will affect the geometry of the blade. An inexperienced polisher can quickly ruin a blade by applying too much pressure to the softened areas, rapidly altering the blade's shape without much change to the hardened zone.

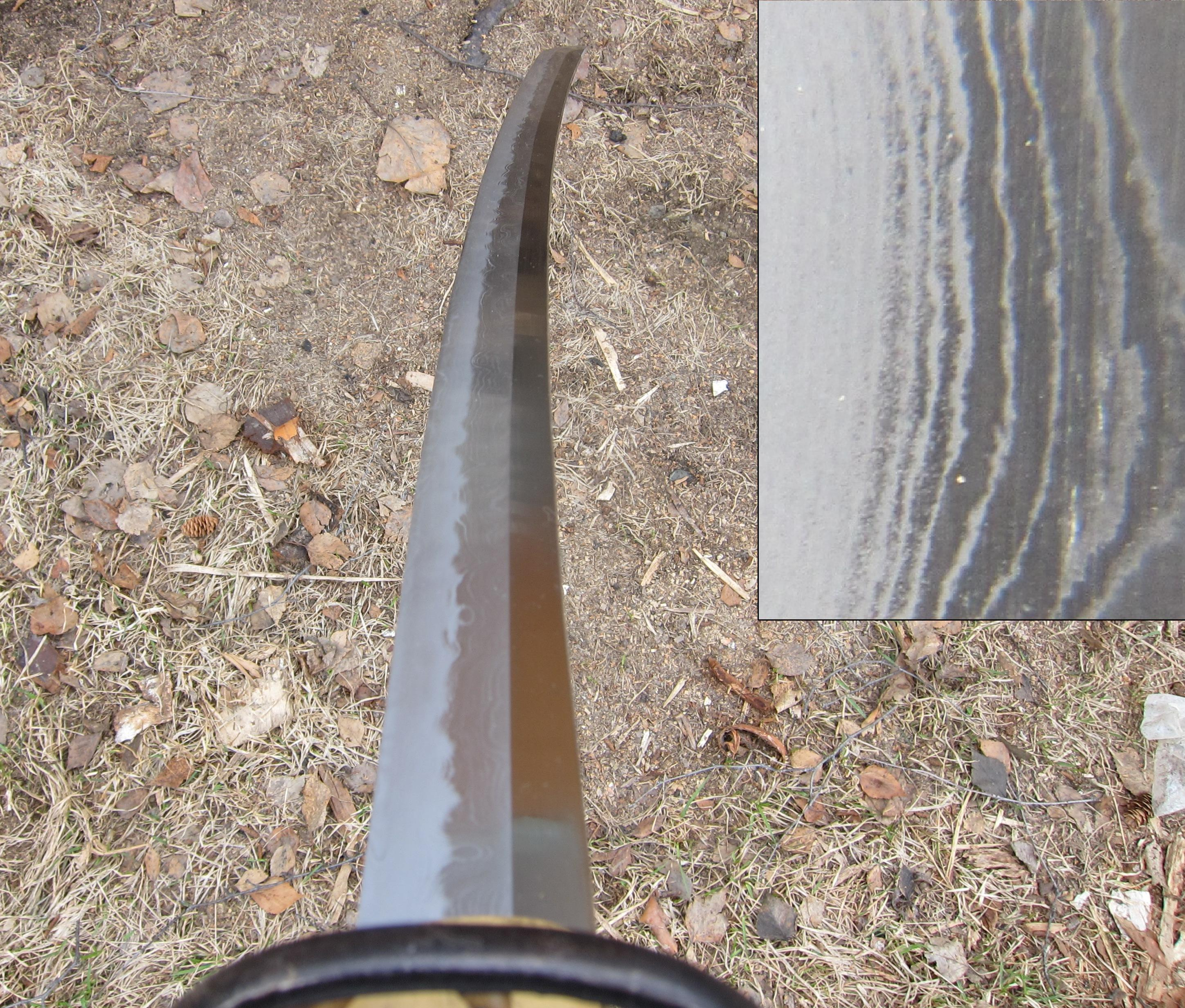
A katana, shown at a long angle to reveal the nioi, which is the bright line following the hamon. The inset shows a close up of the nioi, which appears as the speckled area between the bright hardened edge and the darker soft zone. The wood-grain appearance is from the folding techniques used during forging.

Although both the pearlite and martensite can be polished to a mirror-like shine, only the back and spine are usually polished to such an extent. The hardened portion of the blade (yakiba) and the center portion (hira) are often given a matte finish instead, to make the differences in the hardness stand out. This causes the various microstructures to reflect light differently when viewed from different angles. The pearlite takes on longer, deeper scratches, and either appears shiny and bright, or sometimes dark depending on the viewing angle. The martensite is harder to scratch, so the microscopic abrasions are smaller. The martensite usually appears brighter yet flatter than the pearlite, and this is less dependent on the viewing angle. When polished or etched with acid to reveal these features, a distinct boundary is observed between the martensite portion of the blade and the pearlite. This boundary is often called the "temper line", or the commonly used Japanese term, the "hamon". Between the hardened edge and the hamon lies an intermediate zone, called the '"nioi" in Japanese, which is usually only visible at long angles. The nioi is about a millimeter or two wide, following the hamon, which is made up of individual martensite grains (niye) surrounded by pearlite. The nioi provides a very tough boundary between the yakiba and the hira.

==== Decorative hardening ====
In Japan, from the legendary time of the famous smith Amakuni, hamons were originally straight and parallel to the edge, but by the twelfth century AD, smiths such as Shintogo Kunimitsu began producing hamons with very irregular shapes, which provided both mechanical and decorative benefits. By the sixteenth century AD, the Japanese smiths often overheated their swords slightly before quenching, to produce rather large niye for aesthetic purposes, even though a larger grain size tended to weaken the sword a bit. During this time, great attention began to be paid in Japan to making decorative hamons, by carefully shaping the clay. It became very common during this era to find swords with wavy hamons, flowers or clovers depicted in the temper line, rat's feet, trees, or other shapes. By the eighteenth century, decorative hamons were often being combined with decorative folding techniques to produce entire landscapes, complete with specific islands, crashing waves, hills, mountains, rivers, and sometimes low spots were cut in the clay to produce niye far away from the hamon, creating effects such as birds in the sky.

==== Benefits and drawbacks ====
Although differential hardening produces a very hard edge, it also leaves the rest of the sword rather soft, which can make it prone to bending under heavy loads, such as parrying a hard blow. It can also make the edge more susceptible to chipping or cracking. Swords of this type can usually only be resharpened a few times before reaching the softer metal underneath the edge. However, if properly protected and maintained, these blades can usually hold an edge for long periods of time, even after slicing through bone and flesh, or heavily matted bamboo to simulate cutting through body parts, as is in iaido.

== Modern differential hardening ==
=== Flame hardening ===
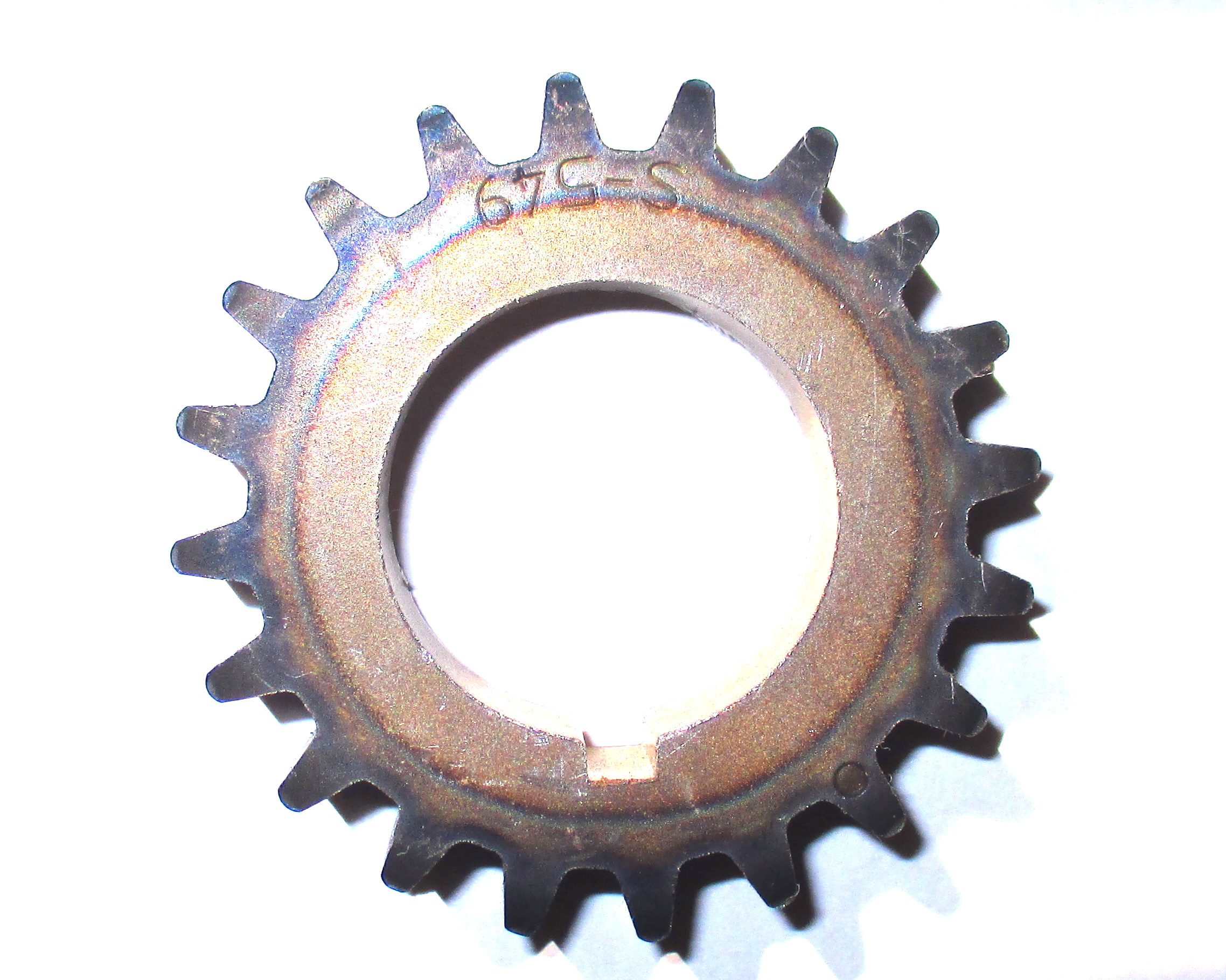
A flame-hardened timing-sprocket. The discoloration around the teeth indicate the metal that was heated and quenched, with the heat-affected zone visible as a thin layer between it and the ring of tempering colors.

Flame hardening is often used to harden only a portion of an object, by quickly heating it with a very hot flame in a localized area, and then quenching the steel. This turns the heated portion into very hard martensite, but leaves the rest unchanged. Usually, an oxy-gas torch is used to provide such high temperatures. Flame hardening is a very common surface hardening technique, which is often used to provide a very wear-resistant surface. A common use is for hardening the surface of gears, making the teeth more resistant to erosion. The gear will usually be quenched and tempered to a specific hardness first, making a majority of the gear tough, and then the teeth are quickly heated and immediately quenched, hardening only the surface. Afterward, it may or may not be tempered again to achieve the final differential hardness.

This process is often used for knife making, by heating only the edge of a previously quenched and tempered blade. When edge turns the proper color temperature, it is quenched, hardening only the edge, but leaving most of the rest of the blade at the lower hardness. The knife is then tempered again to produce the final differential hardness. However, unlike a blade that has been evenly heated and differentially quenched, flame hardening creates a heat-affected zone. Unlike the nioi, the boundary between the hot and cold metal formed by this heat-affected zone causes extremely rapid cooling when quenched. When combined with the stresses formed, this creates a very brittle zone between the hard and softer metal, which usually makes this method unsuitable for swords or tools that may be subjected to shear and impact stresses.

=== Induction hardening ===
Induction hardening is a surface hardening technique which uses induction coils to provide a very rapid means of heating the metal. With induction heating, the steel can be heated very quickly to red-hot at the surface, before the heat can penetrate any distance into the metal. The surface is then quenched, hardening it, and is often used without further tempering. This makes the surface very resistant to wear, but provides tougher metal directly underneath it, leaving the majority of the object unchanged. A common use for induction hardening is for hardening the bearing surfaces, or "journals", on automotive crankshafts or the rods of hydraulic cylinders.

== Differential tempering ==
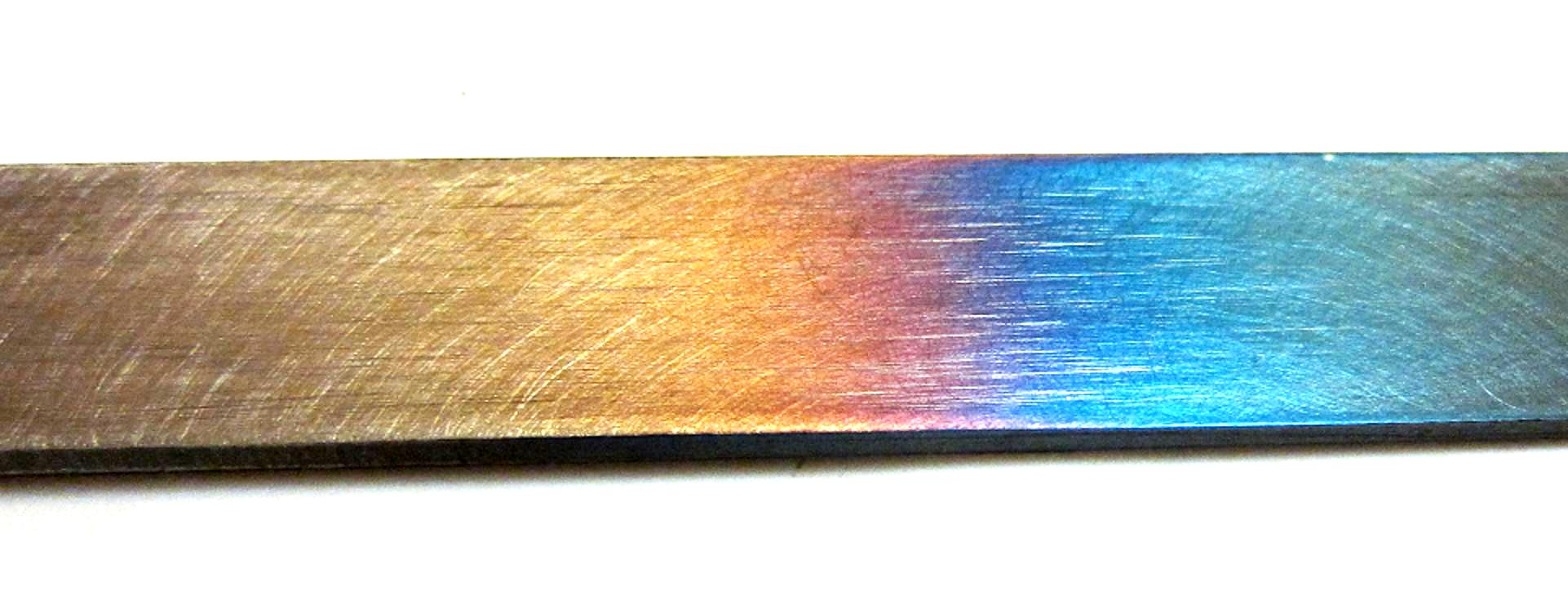
A planing chisel being differentially tempered, showing the colors moving across the long, flat section between the shaft (blue) and the cutting edge (yellow).

Differential tempering (also called graded tempering, selective tempering or local tempering) is the inverse of differential hardening, to ultimately produce similar results. Differential tempering begins by taking steel that has been uniformly quenched and hardened, and then heating it in localized areas to reduce the hardness. The process is often used in blacksmithing for tempering cutting instruments, softening the back, shaft, or spine, but simultaneously tempering the edge to a very high hardness. The process was very common in ancient Europe, for making tools, but soon was applied to knives and swords as well.

=== Blacksmithing ===
The most common use for differential tempering was for heat treating cutting tools, such as axes and chisels, where an extremely hard edge is desired, but some malleability and springiness is needed in the rest of the tool. A chisel with a very hard edge can maintain that edge longer and cut harder materials, but, if the entire chisel was too hard, it would shatter under the hammer blows. Differential tempering was often used to provide a very hard cutting edge, but to soften parts of the tool that are subject to impact and shock loading.

Before a tool is differentially tempered, it is first heated to red-hot and then quenched, hardening the entire tool. This makes the tool much too hard for normal use, so the tool is tempered to reduce the hardness to a more suitable point. However, unlike normal tempering, the tool is not heated evenly. Instead, the heat is applied to only a part of the tool, allowing the heat to thermally conduct toward the cooler cutting edge. The quenched-steel is first sanded or polished, to remove any residual oxidation, revealing the bare metal underneath. The steel is then heated in a localized area, such as the hammering-end of a chisel or the handle-end of an axe. The smith then carefully gauges the temperature by watching the tempering colors of the steel. As the steel is heated, these colors will form, ranging from yellow to brown, purple, and blue, and many shades in between, and will indicate the temperature of the steel. As heat is applied, the colors will form near the heat source, and then slowly move across the tool, following the heat as it conducts toward the edge.

Before the yellow or "light-straw" color reaches the edge, the smith removes the heat. The heat will continue to conduct, moving the colors toward the edge for a short time after the heat is removed. When the light-straw color reaches the edge, the smith will usually dip the steel in water, to stop the process. This will generally produce a very hard edge, around HRc58-60 on the Rockwell scale, but will leave the opposite end of the tool much softer. The hardness of the cutting edge is generally controlled by the chosen color, but will also be affected primarily by the carbon content in the steel, plus a variety of other factors. The exact hardness of the soft end depends on many factors, but the main one is the speed at which the steel was heated, or how far the colors spread out. The light-straw color is very hard, brittle steel, but the light-blue is softer and very springy. Beyond the blue color, when the steel turns grey, it is more likely to be very malleable, which is usually undesirable in a chisel. If the steel is too soft it can bend or mushroom, plastically deforming under the force of the hammer.

==== Grade of temper ====
Unlike with differential hardening, in differential tempering there is no distinct boundary between the harder and softer metals, but the change from hard to soft is very gradual, forming a continuum, or "grade" (gradient), of hardness. However, higher heating temperatures cause the colors to spread less, creating a much steeper grade, while lower temperatures can make the change more gradual, using a smaller portion of the entire continuum. The tempering colors only represent a fraction of the entire grade, because the metal turns grey above 650 °F (343 °C), making it difficult to judge the temperature, but the hardness will continue to decrease as the temperature rises.

==== Guiding the heat ====
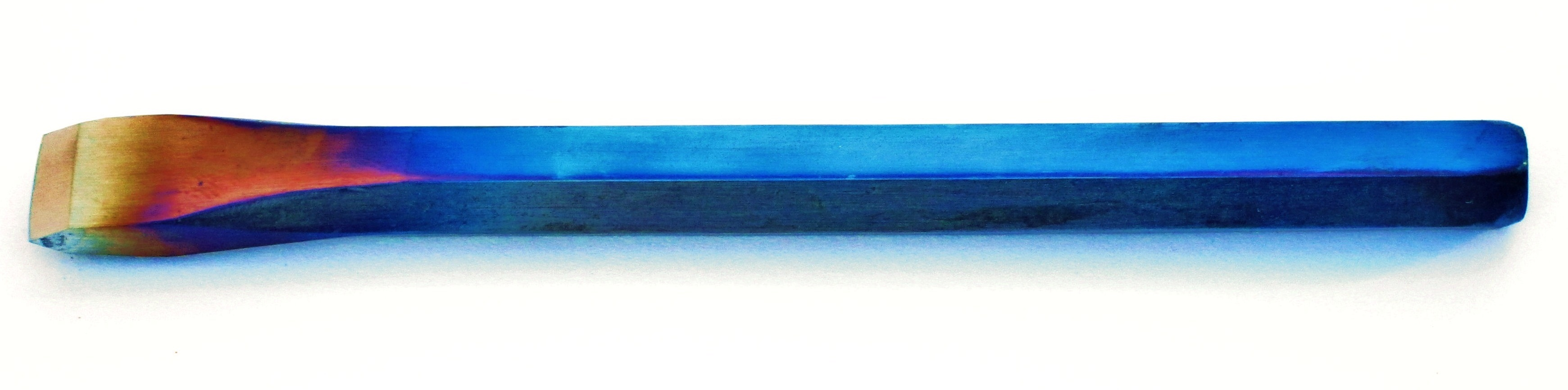
A differentially tempered cold chisel

Heating in just one area, like the flat end of a center punch, will cause the grade to spread evenly down the length of the tool. Because having a continuous grade along the length of the entire tool is not always desired, methods of concentrating the change have been devised. A tool like a chisel may be heated quickly but evenly along the entire shaft, tempering it to a purple or blue color, but allowing the residual heat to quickly conduct a short distance to the edge. Another method is to hold the edge in water, keeping it cool as the rest of the tool is tempered. When the proper color is reached, the edge is removed from the water and allowed to temper from the residual heat, and the entire tool is plunged in the water when the edge turns the proper color. However, heating in localized areas with such low temperatures may be difficult with larger items, like an axe or a splitting maul, because the steel may lose too much heat before it can conduct to the edge. Sometimes the steel is heated evenly to just below the desired temperature, and then differentially tempered, making it easier to control the temperature change. Another way is to partially embed the steel in an insulator, like sand or lime, preventing too much heat loss during tempering.

=== Bladesmithing ===
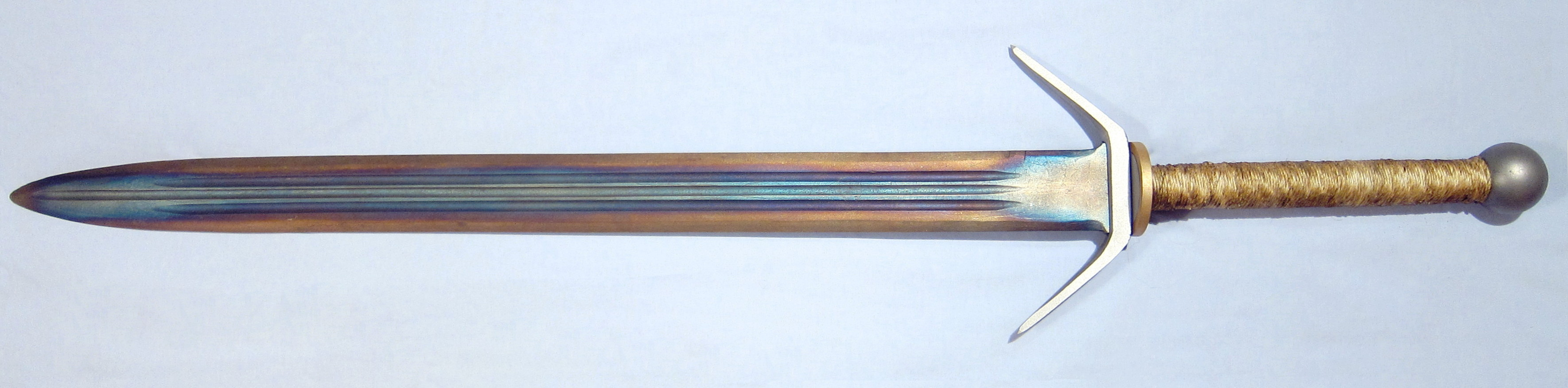
A differentially tempered sword. Made of 5160 carbon steel and balanced right at the end of the fullers, the edge has been tempered slightly harder than a hammer, whereas the center, hilt and handle are tempered to a spring hardness.

Eventually, this process was applied to swords and knives, to produce mechanical effects that were similar to differential hardening, but with some important differences. To differentially temper a blade, it is first quenched to harden the entire blade evenly. The blade is then heated in a localized area, allowing the heat to flow toward the edge. With single-edged blades, the blade may be tempered with fire or a torch. The blade is heated along the spine and tang only, allowing the heat to conduct to the edge. The heat will need to be applied evenly, allowing the colors to spread evenly across the blade. However, with double-edged blades, the heat source will usually need to be more precisely localized because the heat must be applied evenly along the center of the blade, allowing it to conduct to both edges. Often, a red or yellow-hot bar is used to supply the heat, placing it along the center of the blade, typically fitted into a fuller. Modern gas torches often have the ability to produce very precise flames. To prevent too much heat loss in the blade, it may be preheated, partially insulated, or sandwiched between two red-hot bars. When the proper color reaches the edge, it is immersed in water to stop the process.

==== Guiding the heat ====
Differential tempering can be made more difficult by the shape of the blade. When tempering a double-edged sword with a taper along its length, the tip may reach the proper temperature before the shank does. The smith may need to control the temperature by using methods like pouring water along certain parts of the edge, or cooling it with ice, causing the proper temperature to reach the entire edge at the same time. In this way, although it is less time-consuming than differential hardening with clay, once the process starts the smith must be vigilant, carefully guiding the heat. This leaves little room for error, and mistakes in shaping the hardened zone cannot easily be corrected. This is made even more difficult if the knife or sword has a curve, an odd shape, or a sharply tapered tip. Swords tempered in this manner, especially double-edged swords, will generally need to be rather wide, allowing room for a gradient to form. However differential tempering does not alter the blade's shape.

==== Metallurgy ====
When a sword, knife or tool is evenly quenched, the entire object turns into martensite, which is extremely hard, without the formation of soft pearlite. Tempering reduces the hardness in the steel by gradually changing the martensite into a microstructure of various carbides, such as cementite, and softer ferrite (iron), forming a microstructure called "tempered martensite". When tempering high-carbon steel in the blacksmith method, the color provides a general indication of the final hardness, although some trial-and-error is usually required to match the right color to the type of steel to achieve the exact hardness, because the carbon content, the heating speed, and even the type of heat source will affect the outcome. Without the formation of pearlite, the steel can be incrementally tempered to achieve the proper hardness in each area, ensuring that no area is too soft. In arming swords, for instance, because the blade is typically rather wide and thin, a blade can be prone to bending during combat. If the center of the blade is too soft, this bending may likely be permanent. However, if the sword is tempered to a springy hardness, it will be more likely to return to its original shape.

==== Benefits and drawbacks ====
A sword tempered this way cannot usually have an edge as hard as a differentially-hardened sword, like a katana, because there is no softer metal directly underneath the edge to back-up the harder metal. This makes the edge more likely to chip away in larger pieces. Therefore, such an extremely hard edge is not always desirable, as greater hardness makes the edge more brittle and less resistant to impacts, such as cutting through bones, shafts of pole-arms, hitting shields or blocking and parrying. The sword will often be tempered to slightly higher temperatures to increase the impact resistance at a cost in the ability to hold a sharp edge when cutting. The edge may need to be tempered to dark-straw or brown to achieve this, and the center tempered to a blue or purple color. This may leave very little difference between the edge and the center, and the benefits of this method, over tempering the sword evenly at a point somewhere in the middle, may not be very substantial. When a sword tempered in this way is resharpened the hardness will decrease with each sharpening, although the reduction in hardness will usually not be noticeable until a large amount of steel has been removed.

== See also ==
- Case hardening
- Shot peening

== Bibliography ==
- Prabhudev, K. H. (1988). Handbook Of Heat Treatment Of Steels. Tata McGraw-Hill Education. ISBN 978-0-07-451831-1.
- Smith, Cyril Stanley (September 2012). A History of Metallography: The Development of Ideas on the Structure of Metals Before 1890. Literary Licensing, LLC. ISBN 978-1-258-47336-5.
