= Honyaki =

Traditional Japanese forging technique

Honyaki — 本焼 — (literally "true-fired") is the name for the Japanese traditional method of metalwork construction most often seen in kitchen knives, but also other tools. By forging a blade with a technique most similar to the tradition of nihonto, from a single piece of hard high-carbon steel, which is covered with clay during part of the processing, to yield upon quenching, three distinct parts to the blade:

1. a flexible and resilient spine
2. a hamon — a temper line running the length of the blade
3. a hard, sharp cutting edge

Further, this steel can be either mizu honyaki, water-quenched, or abura honyaki, oil-quenched. The goal is to produce a sharper, longer lasting edge than is usually achievable with the lamination method. The term has been adapted to describe high-end mono-stainless steel in Japan and carbon blades by non-Japanese cutlers that have a hamon, but are designed and made with Western equipment, steel, heat treatment, and finished with etching and polishing.

== Traditional process ==
=== Fuel and steel ===
Pine charcoal is cut to size for use in the fire as gentle heat for the blade before quench. Coke is the most common fuel to forge the blade to shape and is preheated to remove remaining sulfur and phosphorus. Gas is cheaper and may also be used but may yield lower quality, whereas pine charcoal may yield higher quality but it is more expensive. An electric fan or a box bellow is used to feed air into the forge. The steel is usually one of the carbon knife steels Hitachi produces at Yasugi Specialty Steel. These are the unalloyed White steel (1, 2, 3) and the tungsten and chromium alloyed Blue steel (1, 2, Super), with White 2 the most common and Blue 2 the next most produced. Less common are White 1 and White 3 and rarely used is Blue Super (because it is much harder to forge due to the resiliency to stretching from the alloying), and even less common is tamahagane (as the steel is expensive, much more difficult to process, and must be correctly forge welded and flattened).

=== Steel qualities and quenchant ===
Blacksmith skill aside and specific heat treatment aside, the 1 versions (higher carbon) are harder, more wear resistant, more fragile and harder to forge, harder to sharpen, and harder to straighten. The 3 versions (lower carbon, at the eutectoid point) are not necessarily softer, but often tougher, easier to sharpen, and easier to make. Blue steel is more difficult to forge, sharpen, and straighten (because the "soft" steel covered by clay still hardens). To perform traditional water quench on this steel can exacerbate the formation of cracks because of its deeper hardening. White steel 1 is difficult to forge and to quench due to its higher carbon and can become harder and more brittle than White 2. A water quench with these traditional steels and processes will result in a blade that is harder, stiffer, sharper with longer lasting sharpness but that is more difficult to sharpen and relatively less tough. An oil quench with the same steels will result in a blade that is marginally less hard, stiff, sharp with less lasting sharpness but that is easier to sharpen and tougher. The choice of quenchant depends on user preference of blade qualities.

=== Forging ===
Unlike awase bocho, honyaki in general have no need to raise to forge welding heat. This skips the possible carbon migration to the mild steel and decarburization from the heating to around 1000 degrees Celsius. Furthermore, the smith skips the need to weld the layers careful under careful heating and to evenly forge the core steel. In this regard to forging White 2 steel, honyaki is easier than in awase bocho. More alloy and higher carbon make this more difficult. There are multiple re-heatings and forging from high temperatures downward. Blades are cooled and annealed in carbonized rice straw or ash, cut to rough shape, cold forged, and corrected for distortion multiple times. They are preferably left to stabilize for a bit between each step to help reduce distortion. The knife is rough ground to shape with the omote, urasuki, and profile. These steps generally require more effort than with laminated knives.

=== Quenching ===
A paste is applied to the blade using water, charcoal, clay, ground natural sharpening stone, and other ingredients in a proprietary way and composition. This thicker paste goes on the blade spine on both sides and traditionally mimics the wavy hamon of nihonto. A thinner slip goes on the hard edge to help heat transfer there. It then must dry in air or over heat. The quench water or oil is prepared and brought to the right temperature. The forge is heated. Lights are turned off and the room shut from the outside. Once ready, the blade is buried and shuffled around in the charcoal and when it reaches the correct temperature it is thrust into water and moved forward and back (so as to prevent lateral distortion) and then after a couple seconds side to side. The knife could also be brought up slightly above temperature and then held in the room to the correct temperature before quench. The quench could be interrupted toward the end for more rough grinding or to correct distortion. The blade is tempered either immediately over fire, or in oil, or in an oven. The water quench regularly destroys many blades by cracking them or warping them too badly to reasonably sell.

=== Sharpening and finishing ===
The forged and quenched blade is preferably left to sit for some time to age-harden, so that when the knife is made straight, few if any distortions will appear later on as the knife ages further. If the knife is being made under the Sakai, Osaka production system, the knife is sent to a sharpener who corrects for distortion and sharpens simultaneously to make the final geometry and profile of the knife, and then is finished by polishing, engraving, and installation of handle by other craftsmen. It may be mirror polished or finished with natural stones to highlight the hamon, resist rusting, and improve balance and some honyaki display alloy banding upon polish. The handle is installed and a saya is usually made. Ebony fittings denote ornamental display as the wood is hard enough to scratch the blade in the saya and the ebony can crack under changes in humidity, and the extra weight may make holding the knife more tiring but can help balance with longer blades. If used for work, it represents the status of the cost and knowledge of proper care and use. The extra labor in manufacture, sharpening, and finishing, time lost to failed blades, and skill in temperature control and forging contributes to the higher price compared to usual laminated blades.

== Culture and use ==
=== Craftsman ===
Honyaki is the application of Japanese swordsmithing tradition. Blacksmithing backgrounds (specialty, personality, geography, family lineage, teacher, knowledge, money, tradition, business structure) differ and accordingly produce different interpretation of the technique. It usually represents the best work of all craftsmen involved.

=== Chef ===
Traditionally chefs first learn to use stainless, then kasumi, hon-kasumi, and finally mizu or abura honyaki. The honyaki knives are usually used only after completion of an apprenticeship after becoming proficient in ingredients, cooking, sharpening, and knife use. Honyaki knives are usually harder to sharpen in comparison to laminated blades because they have no mild steel that is quickly removed and are usually even harder. They usually chip more easily in use and sharpening and are extra sensitive to hard surfaces including in sharpening. As the edge is more fragile, the user must know how to hold, cut, sharpen, store, and care for it.

=== Laminated v. Honyaki steels ===
From a strictly heat treat and microscopy point of view, there should be no difference between a laminated and honyaki steel with the same observed structure and heat treat process, but the heat treat necessarily differs, and many users say there is benefit to honyaki. Many users also prefer laminated blades for ease of maintenance, sharpening feel, cost, and toughness. Many blacksmiths prefer laminated blades because at the minimum, they are easier to produce. At the highest levels they have core steel of comparable hardness and sharpness and are not necessarily easier to make due to the skill to forge weld at lower temperatures, with minimal loss of carbon, less flux and iron powder, and with minimal scars while stretching out the laminate. Pattern welding (suminagashi) requires its own skill as well and can produce a stiffer awase knife with less distortion during use and sharpening.

== Makers and brands ==
As Sakai is the kitchen knife capital of Japan, many honyaki come from there. Blacksmiths who have produced honyaki include Futoshi Nagao, Genkai, Hiroki Ashi, Kenichi Shiraki, Satoshi Nakagawa, Kenji Togashi, Kiyoshi Kato, Jyunichi Takagi, Okishiba Masakuni, Tatsuo Ikeda, Watanabe, Yasha Yukawa, Jun Mizuno and Yoshikazu Ikeda.

Brands that offer honyaki include Akifusa, Aritsugu, Ashi Hamono, Carter Cutlery, Fudo Kuniyuki, Gesshin, Ino, Ittotsai Kotetsu, Kikuichi-monji, Hiromoto, Konosuke, Masamoto Sohonten, Masamoto Tsukiji, Minamoto Izumimasa, Mizuno Tanrenjo, Monzaburo, MAC Corporation, Nenohi, Sakai Takayuki, Singatirin, Suisin, Sukenari, Tesshu, Tsubaya, Yamamoto Haken (Hide), Yoshihiro/Yamawaki.

Stainless honyaki is actually termed zenko, include Suisin Inox Honyaki and Masahiro MV Honyaki.

Makers of Western-style honyaki include Cris Anderson, Bill Burke, Walter Sorrels, Jesus Hernandez, Milan Gravier, William Catcheside, Tslil Censor, Damian Kordic, MSicard Cutlery, Nathan James Knives, Bob Kramer, Bryan Raquin, Emiliano Carrillo, and Mert Tansu.
