= Amakuni =

Legendary Japanese swordsmith

Amakuni Yasutsuna (天國 安綱) is the legendary swordsmith who supposedly created the first single-edged longsword (tachi) with curvature along the edge in the Yamato Province around 700 AD. He was the head of a group of swordsmiths employed by the Emperor of Japan to make weapons for his warriors. His son, Amakura, was the successor to his work. Although there are almost no modern examples of signed works by Amakuni, legend has it that the double-edged katana, Kogarasu Maru, was forged by this man. The true author of this work is not known, though the work bears similarities to works of the various Yamato schools so it is thought to be an early example of work from this province.

== The legend ==
One day, Amakuni and his son, Amakura, were standing in the doorway of their shop, watching the Emperor's warriors return from battle. Although having done so on previous occasions, the Emperor did not give Amakuni any sign of recognition. Having always looked upon these gestures as a sign of appreciation for his efforts and hard work, Amakuni suddenly noticed that nearly half of the returning warriors were carrying broken swords.

Determined to make things right, Amakuni and Amakura went about gathering remnants of the swords and examined them. It appeared that the chief reasons for breakage were that the swords had been improperly forged and that the soldiers had struck hard objects, probably armor or other weapons, with them. Once again, the Emperor's subtle yet audible rebuff ran through his mind. Tears filled Amakuni's eyes, and he said to himself, "If they are going to use our swords for such slashing, I shall make one that will not break."

With this vow, Amakuni and his son sealed themselves away in the forge and prayed for seven days and seven nights to the Shinto gods. Amakuni then selected the best iron sand ore he could obtain and refined it into steel. Working without rest, the two worked at their apparently impossible task. Thirty one days later, Amakuni and his son emerged gaunt and weary from the forge with a single-edged sword with curvature. Undaunted by the other swordsmiths, who believed them to be insane, Amakuni and Amakura ground and polished the new sword.

During the following months, Amakuni and his son continued with their work, forging many types of improved swords. In the following spring, there was another war. Again the samurai returned, and as they passed by, he counted over thirty-one swords with imperfect, intact blades. As the Emperor passed, he smiled and said, "You are an expert swordmaker. None of the swords you have made failed in this battle." Amakuni rejoiced and once more felt that life was full and joyous.

It is not known when Amakuni died, though legend has it that he gained immortality from the large amount of blood shed from the blades he created.
