= Glossary of Japanese swords =

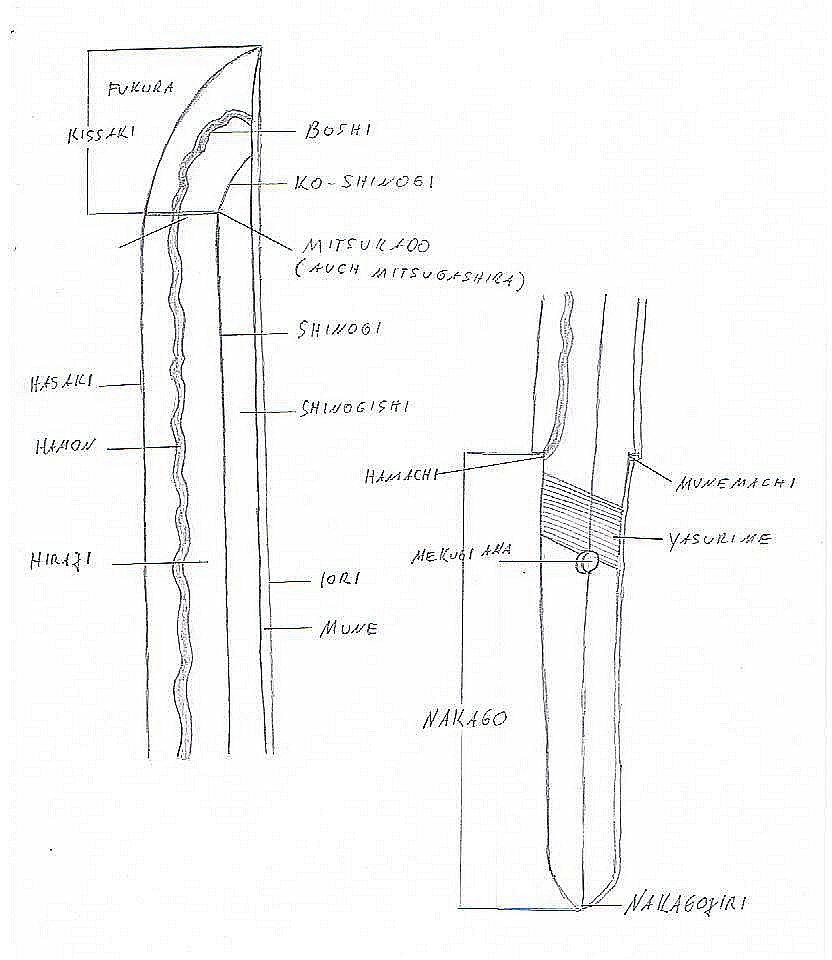
Diagram showing the parts of a nihontō blade in transliterated Japanese

This is the glossary of Japanese swords, including major terms the casual reader might find useful in understanding articles on Japanese swords. Within definitions, words set in boldface are defined elsewhere in the glossary.

== A ==
- ashi (足, "leg") – thin line that runs across the temper line (**hamon**) to the cutting edge (**ha**).
- ayasugi-hada (綾杉肌) – regular wavy surface grain pattern (**jihada**). Also known as gassan-hada after the name of a school which usually produced swords of this type.

== B ==
- bokutō (木刀) – an authentically shaped wooden (practice) sword (or other bladed weapon).
- bōshi (帽子) – temper line (hamon) of the blade point (**kissaki**). (see image) (also see **ko-maru**)

== C ==
- chikei (地景) – black gleaming lines of **nie** that appear in the **ji**.
- chirimen-hada (縮緬肌, crape grain pattern) – distinctly visible **mokume-hada** with a clearer steel than in similar but coarser patterns.
- chōji midare (丁子乱れ, "clove disorder") – an irregular **hamon** pattern resembling cloves, with a round upper part and a narrow constricted lower part.
- chokutō (直刀; lit. straight sword) – a straight sword primarily produced during the ancient period (**jokotō**). Their definition as **tachi** (大刀) is specifically chronological, as it refers solely to ancient pre- Heian swords, unlike **tachi** (太刀) which refers to later swords. These ancient Japanese swords are also known as **jokotō** (上古刀, ancient sword).
- chōken (長剣, long sword) – Commonly used as a calque for the broadest definition of (European) long swords.
- chōtō (長刀; lit. long sword) – either a **nagakatana** (due to long blade) or a **naginata** (due to long handle).

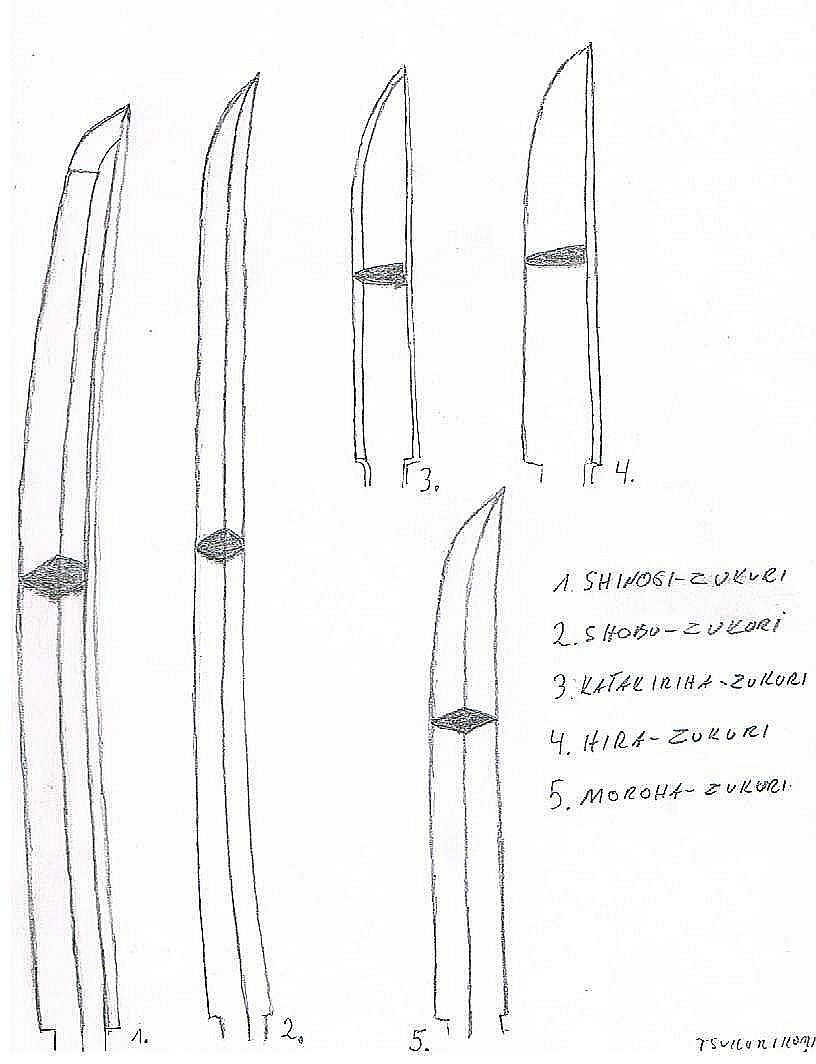
Types of sword structures (tsukurikomi) in transliterated Japanese

== D ==
- daishō (大小; lit. large (and) small) – in context any pair of Japanese swords of differing lengths (**daitō** and **shōtō**) worn together.
- daitō (大刀; lit. large sword) – any type of Japanese long sword, the larger in a pair of **daishō**. Commonly a **katana**.

== F ==
- fukura (脹) – the cutting edge (**ha**) of the blade point (**kissaki**). (see image)
- funbari (踏ん張り) – tapering of the blade from the base (**machi**) to the point (**kissaki**)

== G ==
- gassan-hada (月山肌) – see **ayasugi-hada**.
- gendaitō (現代刀, modern swords) – swords produced after 1876. Also the name for the period in sword history from 1876 to the present day, i.e., the period that succeeded the **shinshintō** period.
- goban kaji (御番鍛冶, "honorable rotation smiths") – swordsmiths summoned by the retired Emperor Go-Toba to work at his palace in monthly rotations.
- gokaden (五ヶ伝, Five traditions) – the five basic styles of swords which during the **kotō** period were associated with the provinces: Yamashiro, Yamato, Bizen, Sagami/Sōshū and Mino.
- gomabashi (護摩箸) – pair of parallel grooves running partway up the blade resembling chopsticks.
- gunome (互目) – a wave-like outline of the temper line (**hamon**) made up of similarly sized semicircles.

== H ==
- ha (刃, edge) – the tempered cutting edge of a blade. The side opposite the **mune**. Also called **hasaki** or **yaiba**. (see image)
- hajimi (刃染) – misty spots in the temper line (**hamon**) resulting from repeated grinding or faulty tempering.
- hamachi (刃区) – notch in the cutting edge (**ha**), dividing the blade proper from the tang (**nakago**). (see image)
- hamon (刃文) – border between the tempered part of the **ha** (cutting edge) and the untempered part of the rest of the sword; the temper-line. (see image)
- hasaki (刃先) – see **ha**.
- hataraki (働, activity, workings) – patterns and shapes such as lines, streaks, dots and hazy reflections that appear in addition to the grain pattern (**jihada**) and the temper line (**hamon**) on the surface of the steel and are a result of sword polishing.
- hijiki-hada (鹿尾菜肌) – see **matsukawa-hada**.
- hira (平) – see **hiraji**.
- hiraji (平地) – curved surface between ridge (**shinogi**) and temper line (**hamon**). Also called **hira**. If polished, the hiraji appears blue-black. (see image)
- hira-zukuri (平造) – a nearly flat blade without ridge (**shinogi**) or **yokote**. (see image)
- hitatsura (皆焼) – temper line (**hamon**) with tempering marks visible around the ridge and near the edge of the blade.
- hon-zukuri (本造, main style) – see **shinogi-zukuri**.

== I ==
- ichimai bōshi (一枚帽子) – a fully tempered point area (**kissaki**) because the **hamon** turns back before reaching the point.
- ichimonji kaeri (一文字返り) – a **bōshi** which turns back in a straight horizontal line with a short **kaeri**.
- ikubi-kissaki (猪首切先, "boar's neck point") – a short, stubby blade point (**kissaki**).
- iori (庵) – top ridge of the back edge (**mune**), the back ridge. (see image)
- itame-hada (板目肌) – surface grain pattern (**jihada**) of scattered irregular ovals resembling wood grain. The small/large grain pattern of this type is called ko-itame-hada/ō-itame-hada.

== J ==
- ji (地) – area between the ridge (**shinogi**) and the **hamon**.
- jigane (地鉄) – generally used to refer to the material of the blade.
- jihada (地肌, grain, texture) – visible surface pattern of the steel resulting from hammering and folding during the construction. (also see **masame-hada**, **mokume-hada**, **itame-hada** and **ayasugi-hada**)
- ji-nie (地沸え) – **nie** that appears in the **hiraji**.
- jōkotō (上古刀, ancient sword) – a sword produced before the mid-Heian period. Unlike later blades, these are straight swords. The term is also used to refer to the respective period of swordsmanship which was followed by the **kotō** period.
- jūka chōji (重化丁子, "double clove") – multiple overlapping clove shaped **chōji midare** patterns.
- jūken (銃剣, "firearm sword") – a bayonet.

== K ==
- kaeri (返り) – part of the temper line (**hamon**) that extends from the tip of the **bōshi** to the back edge (**mune**).
- kaiken (懐剣) – a dagger concealed in the clothing.
- kasane (重ね) – blade thickness measured across the back edge (**mune**). (see also **motokasane** and **sakikasane**)
- katana (刀) – curved sword with a blade length (**nagasa**) longer than 60 cm (24 in). Worn thrust through the belt with the blade edge (**ha**) facing upward. It superseded the older tachi (太刀) starting in the Muromachi period, after 1392. Also a (now rare) general term for single-edged blades, see **tō**.
- kataochi gunome (肩落ち互目) – a **gunome** with a straight top and an overall slant.
- kawazuko chōji midare (蛙子丁子乱れ, "tadpole clove disorder") – a variation of the **chōji midare** pattern with the peaks resembling tadpoles.
- ken (剣) – a double-edged blade (sword/dagger) of any size or shape.
- kinsuji (金筋, gold line) – short straight thin radiant black line of **nie** that appears in the temper-line (**hamon**).
- kissaki (切先) – fan-shaped point of the blade; separated from the body of the sword by the **yokote**. (see image)
- kōgai (笄) – a skewer for the owner's hair-do, carried in a pocket of the scabbards of **katana** and **wakizashi** on the side opposite of the **kozuka**.
- kogatana (小刀) – any knife, particularly a small utility knife carried in a pocket of the scabbards of **katana** and **wakizashi**.
- ko-itame-hada (小板目肌) – see **itame-hada**.
- ko-maru (小丸, small circle) – a **bōshi** that runs parallel to the cutting edge of the point area (**kissaki**) and then forms a small circle as it turns back towards the back edge (**mune**).
- ko-mokume-hada (小杢目肌) – see **mokume-hada**.
- ko-shinogi (小鎬) – diagonal line that separates the point of a blade (**kissaki**) from the **shinogiji** and extends the ridge (**shinogi**) to the back edge (**mune**) in the **kissaki** area. (see image)
- koshi-zori (腰反) – curvature (**sori**) of the blade with the center of the curve lying near or inside of the tang (**nakago**).
- kotō (古刀, "old sword") – a pre-Edo period sword as opposed to a **shintō**. The year of transition is generally taken to be 1596. The term is also used to refer to the respective period of swordsmanship where the lower limit is given by the appearance of curved swords in the mid-Heian period. The kotō period succeeded the **jokotō** period.
- kozuka (小柄) – handle of a small utility knife (kogatana) carried in a pocket of the scabbards of **katana** and **wakizashi** on the side opposite of the **kōgai**. Also used to refer to the whole knife, i.e. hilt plus blade.
- Kyōhō Meibutsuchō (享保名物帳, register of famous products from the Kyōhō era) – Register of masterpiece swords (**meibutsu**) compiled by the Hon'ami family in the Kyōhō era.

== M ==
- machi (区) – notches that divide the blade proper from the tang. (also see **munemachi** and **hamachi**)
- masame-hada (柾目肌) -straight surface grain pattern (**jihada**).
- Masamune juttetsu (正宗十哲, Ten great disciples of Masamune) – ten excellent students of Masamune: Gō Yoshihiro, Norishige, Kaneuji, Kinju, Rai Kunitsugu, Hasebe Kunishige, Osafune Kanemitsu, Chogi, Samonji, Sekishi Naotsuna.
- matsukawa-hada (松皮肌) – surface grain pattern (**jihada**) resembling the bark of a pine tree. A type of **ō-mokume-hada** or **ō-itame-hada** with thick **chikei**. Also known as hijiki-hada.
- mei (銘) – signature, usually engraved on the tang (**nakago**).
- meibutsu (名物, "famous product") – swords designated as masterpieces. Sometimes used to refer specifically to swords listed in the **Kyōhō Meibutsuchō**.
- mekugi (目釘) – a peg of bamboo or horn which passes through the **mekugiana** to secure the tang in the hilt.
- mekugiana (目釘孔) – hole in the tang (**nakago**) for the retaining peg (**mekugi**) that secures the tang in the hilt. (see image)
- midareba (乱刃) – an irregular temper line (**hamon**). (also see **suguha**)
- midare komi (乱込み) – irregular temper line (**midareba**) that continues into the point (**kissaki**).
- mihaba (身幅, blade width) – distance from the blade edge (**ha**) to the back edge (**mune**). (also see **sakihaba** and **motohaba**)
- mijikagatana (短刀; lit. short sword) – see **tantō**.
- mitsukado (三つ角, three corners) – point at which the **yokote**, **shinogi** and **ko-shinogi** meet. (see image)
- mokume-hada (杢目肌) – surface grain pattern (**jihada**) of small ovals and circles resembling the burl-grain in wood. The small/large grain pattern of this type is called ko-mokume-hada/ō-mokume-hada.
- motohaba (元幅, bottom width) – blade width (**mihaba**) at the bottom of the blade (**machi**).
- motokasane (元重 ね) – blade thickness (**kasane**) at the bottom of the blade (**machi**).
- mune (棟) – back edge of a blade, i.e., the side opposite the cutting edge (**ha**). (see image)
- munemachi (棟区) – notch in the back edge (**mune**), dividing the blade proper from the tang (**nakago**). (see image)

== N ==
- nagakatana (長刀; lit. long sword) – any sword with a blade longer than a **tantō**, particularly exceptionally large ones (e.g. **nodachi**). Also called **chōtō**.
- nagamaki (長巻; "long wrapping") – a large sword with a usually **katana**-sized blade and a very long handle of about equal length. Successor design to the **ōdachi**/**nodachi**.
- naginata (薙刀, 長刀) – polearm wielded in large sweeping strokes. Typically with a wide blade, long **tang** and without **yokote**. It often has a distinctive carved groove. Also called **chōtō**.
- nakago (茎, tang) – unpolished part of a blade that is concealed by the hilt. (see image)
- nakagojiri (茎尻) – end of the tang (**nakago**), i.e., the butt of a blade. (see image)
- nagasa (長さ, length) – blade length measured from the point to the back edge notch (**munemachi**).
- nashiji-hada (梨地肌) – surface grain pattern (**jihada**) resembling the flesh of a sliced pear (jap. nashi); i.e. essentially fine dense **ko-mokume-hada** with surface **nie** throughout.
- nie (沸え) – small distinct crystalline particles due to martensite, austenite, pearlite or troostite that appear like twinkling stars.
- nihontō (日本刀, Japanese sword) – a curved blade with ridge (**shinogi**).
- nioi (匂い) – indistinguishable crystalline particles due to martensite, austenite, pearlite or troostite that appear together like a wash of stars.
- nioi kuzure (匂い崩) – see **yō**.
- nodachi (野太刀; lit. field sword) – very large and heavy sword with lengths (**nagasa**) up to 120–150 cm (47–59 in) for the use in field battles. Worn across the back.
- notare (湾れ) – gently waving temper line (**hamon**).

== O ==
- ōdachi (大太刀) – very large sword invented in the 14th century. with lengths (**nagasa**) of 4–5 ft (1.2–1.5 m). Worn slung from the shoulder.
- ō-hada (大肌) – a large grain pattern (**jihada**).
- ō-itame-hada (大板目肌) – see **itame-hada**.
- ō-mokume-hada (大杢目肌) – see **mokume-hada**.
- ōtachi (大太刀) – alternative reading of **ōdachi**.

== S ==
- sakihaba (先幅, top width) – blade width (**mihaba**) at the **yokote**.
- sakikasane (先重ね) – blade thickness (**kasane**) at the **yokote**.
- saki-zori (先反) – curvature (**sori**) of the blade with the center of the curve lying near the point.
- sansaku bōshi (三作帽子) – **bōshi** seen in the works of the three swordsmiths: Osafune Nagamitsu, Kagemitsu and Sanenaga: **hamon** continues as straight line inside the point (**kissaki**) area running towards the tip of the blade. Just before reaching the tip, the bōshi turns in a small circle (**ko-maru**) a short distance to the back edge (**mune**) remaining inside the **kissaki**.
- shin guntō (新軍刀, neo-army sword) – sword of the Imperial Japanese Army with a metal scabbard (**saya**) produced from the 1930s to the end of World War II in 1945.
- shinken (真剣; lit. real sword) – a real sword as opposed to unsharpened or wooden practice weapons (**bokutou**).
- shinogi (鎬, ridge) – ridge running along the side of the sword, generally closer to the back (**mune**) than the cutting edge (**ha**). (see image)
- shinogiji (鎬地) – flat surface between ridge (**shinogi**) and back edge (**mune**). (see image)
- shinogi-zukuri (鎬造) – a curved blade with **yokote** and a ridge (**shinogi**) quite close to the back edge (**mune**). Also known as hon-zukuri (本造, main style). (see image)
- shinshintō (新々刀, "new-new sword") – period in sword history characterized by the revival of old sword styles, especially those from the Kamakura period. It follows the **shintō** period and is generally dated from the late 18th century to about 1876, when the wearing of swords was prohibited. The term is also used to denote swords produced in this period.
- shintō (新刀, "new sword") – post-Edo period swords produced after the end of the kotō period (after 1596) and before the period of revival of old styles at the end of the 18th century which is known as **shinshintō**. The term is also used to refer to the respective period of swordsmanship.
- shōbu-zukuri (菖蒲造) – a curved blade without **yokote** and a ridge (**shinogi**) quite close to the back edge (**mune**); basically **shinogi-zukuri** without yokote. (see image)
- shōtō (小刀; lit. small sword) – any type of Japanese short sword, the smaller in a pair of **daishō**. Commonly a **wakizashi**.
- sori (反り, curvature) – curvature of the sword measured as the greatest perpendicular distance between the back edge (**mune**) and the chord connecting the back edge notch (**munemachi**) with the point of the blade.
- sugata (姿, shape) – the overall shape of the blade.
- suguha (直刃) – straight temper line (**hamon**). (also see **midareba**)
- sumigane (墨鉄, "ink iron") – plain dark spots on the **ji** that differ considerably from the surface pattern in both color and grain.
- sunagashi (砂流, stream of sand) – marks in the temper line (**hamon**) that resemble the pattern left behind by a broom sweeping over sand.

== T ==
- tachi (大刀) – straight sword (**chokutō**) produced in ancient times with a blade length (**nagasa**) longer than 60 cm (24 in). Not to be confused with the **tachi (太刀)**.
- tachi (太刀) – curved sword with a blade length (**nagasa**) longer than 60 cm (24 in) and typically 70–80 cm (28–31 in). Worn slung across the hip with the blade edge (**ha**) facing down. Primarily produced in the **kotō** period. Not to be confused with the **tachi (大刀)**.
- tanken (短剣, short sword) – knife or dagger (strictly speaking only the latter) with a length (**nagasa**) shorter than 30 cm (12 in) and typically about 26 cm (10 in). Usually constructed in flat style (**hira-zukuri**). (also see **tantō**, **kaiken**) Commonly used as a calque for the broadest definition of (European) short swords.
- tantō (短刀; lit. short sword) – knife or dagger (strictly speaking only the former) with a length (**nagasa**) shorter than 30 cm (12 in) and typically about 26 cm (10 in). Usually constructed in flat style (**hira-zukuri**). Also called **mijikagatana**. (also see **tanken**, **kaiken**)
- tō (刀) – single-edged blades (saber/knife) of any size or shape.
- tobiyaki (飛焼) – a tempered spot within the **ji** not connected to the main temper line (**hamon**).
- tōken (刀剣) – umbrella term for all single- and double-edged blades of any size and shape.
- torii-zori (華表反り) – curvature (**sori**) of the blade in which the center of the curve lies roughly in the center of the blade resembling the horizontal bar of torii.
- tōsu (刀子) – an ancient (**jokotō**) very short knife with blade length (**nagasa**) of 10 cm (3.9 in) or less.
- tsuba (鍔 or 鐔) – sword guard; generally a round metal plate with a central wedge shaped hole for the blade and if needed up to two smaller holes for the **kozuka** or **kōgai**
- tsurugi (剣) – symmetrical double-edged thrusting weapon popular in the Nara and early Heian period. Also a (now rare) general term for double-edged blades, see **ken**.

== U ==
- uchi-zori (內反) – curvature (**sori**) of the blade with a slight curve toward the cutting edge (**ha**).
- utsuri (映り, "reflection") – misty reflection on the **ji** or **shinogiji** usually made of softer steel.

== W ==
- wakizashi (脇差) – blades with a length (**nagasa**) between 30 and 60 cm (12 and 24 in). Shorter of the two swords worn by warriors in the Edo period.

== Y ==
- yaiba (刃) – see **ha**.
- yakitsume (烧诘) – without turn-back (**kaeri**); a **bōshi** that continues directly to the back edge (**mune**).
- yasurime (鑢目) – file marks on the tang (**nakago**) applied as a kind of additional signature and before engraving the real signature (**mei**). (see image)
- yō (葉, "leaves") – activity (**hataraki**) in the temper line (**hamon**) that resembles fallen leaves or tiny footprints. After the late Sengoku period (late 16th century) referred to as nioi kuzure.
- yokote (横手) – line perpendicular to the ridge (**shinogi**) which marks off the **kissaki** from the rest of the blade. (see image)
- yoroi tōshi (鎧通し; lit. straight through armour) – dagger used for cutting through armour. Their length (**nagasa**) was originally fixed at 9.5 sun (29 cm), a value that was later reduced to 7.5 sun (23 cm). Originally worn thrust vertically through the back of the belt; later carried at the ride side with the hilt to the front and the edge facing up.
- yubashiri (湯走) – spot or spots where **nie** is concentrated on the **ji**.

== See also ==
- List of National Treasures of Japan (crafts-swords)

== Bibliography ==
- Kapp, Leon; Kapp, Hiroko; Yoshihara, Yoshindo (2002). Modern Japanese swords and swordsmiths: from 1868 to the present (illustrated ed.). Kodansha International. ISBN 4-7700-1962-9.
- Nagayama, Kōkan (1998). The connoisseur's book of Japanese swords. Kodansha International. ISBN 4-7700-2071-6.
- Satō, Kanzan; Earle, Joe (1983). The Japanese sword. Japanese arts library. Vol. 12 (illustrated ed.). Kodansha International. ISBN 0-87011-562-6.
- Stone, George Cameron (1999). A glossary of the construction, decoration, and use of arms and armor in all countries and in all times: together with some closely related subjects (illustrated ed.). Courier Dover Publications. ISBN 0-486-40726-8.
- Takaiwa, Setsuo; Yoshihara, Yoshindo; Kapp, Leon; Kapp, Hiroko (2006). The Art of Japanese Sword Polishing. Art and Design Series (illustrated ed.). Kodansha International. ISBN 4-7700-2494-0.
- Tsuchiko, Tamio; Mishina, Kenji (2002). The new generation of Japanese swordsmiths (illustrated ed.). Kodansha International. ISBN 4-7700-2854-7.
- Yumoto, John M. (1979). The Samurai sword: a handbook (15 ed.). Tuttle Publishing. ISBN 0-8048-0509-1.
