= Tantō =

Japanese dagger

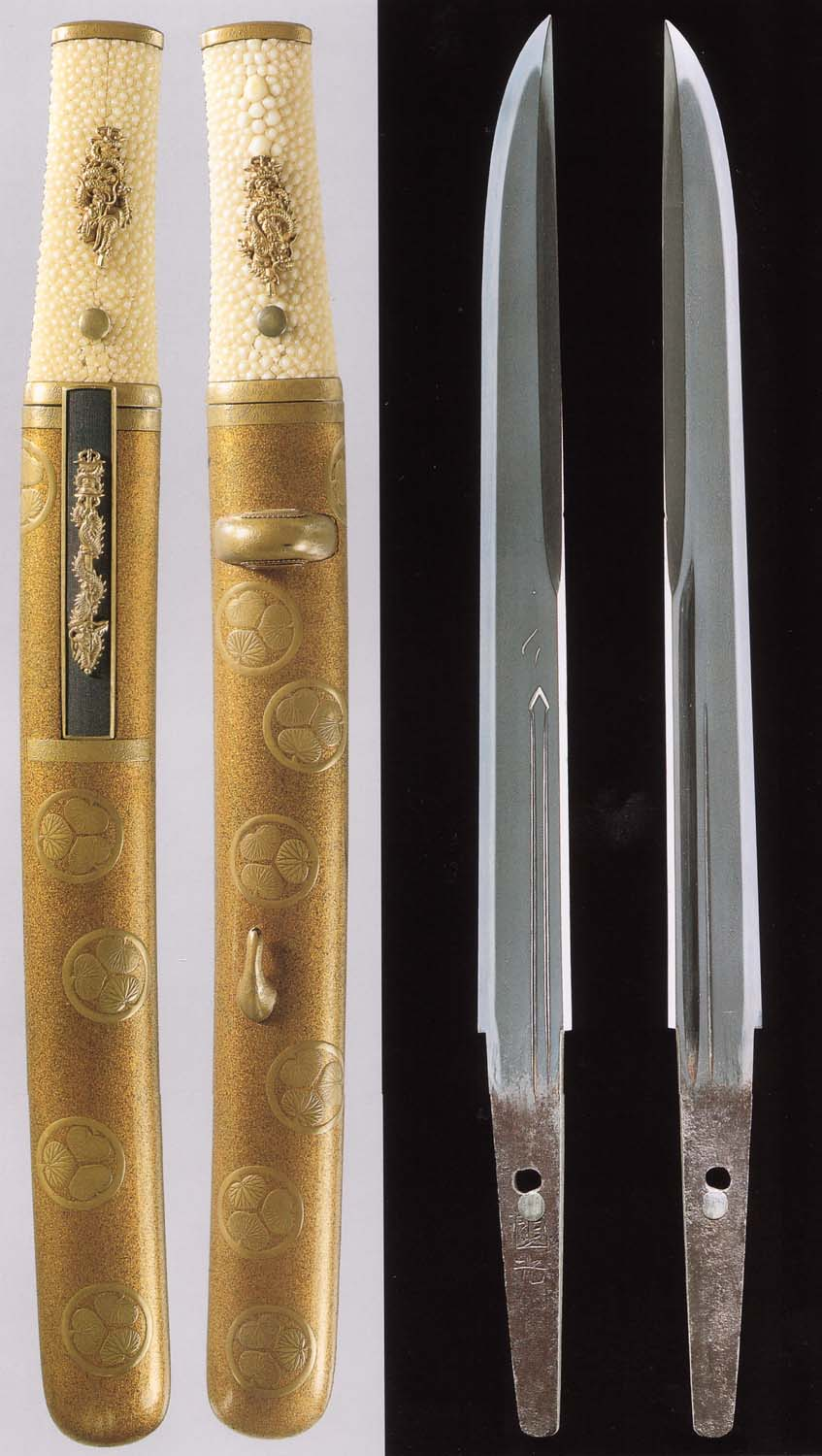
- Tantō with signature (mei) of Shintōgo Kunimitsu. Complete aikuchi-style koshirae (mountings) and bare blade. Kamakura Period, 14th century. Important Cultural Property.
- Type: Japanese sword

Production history
- Produced: Heian period (794–1185) to present

Specifications
- Blade length: approx. 15–30 cm (5.9–11.8 in)
- Blade type: Double or single edged, straight bladed or curved bladed

A tantō (短刀, 'short blade') is a traditionally made Japanese knife (nihontō) that was worn by the samurai class of feudal Japan. The tantō dates to the Heian period, when it was mainly used as a weapon but evolved in design over the years to become more ornate. Tantō were used in traditional martial arts (tantojutsu) and in the seppuku suicide ritual. The term has seen a resurgence in the West since the 1980s as referring to a point style of modern tactical knives, designed for piercing or stabbing, though the style is not present on any traditional tantō.

A Tanto knife may refer to an American style of blade based on the Japanese tantō, usually with a squared rather than curved tip.

== Description ==
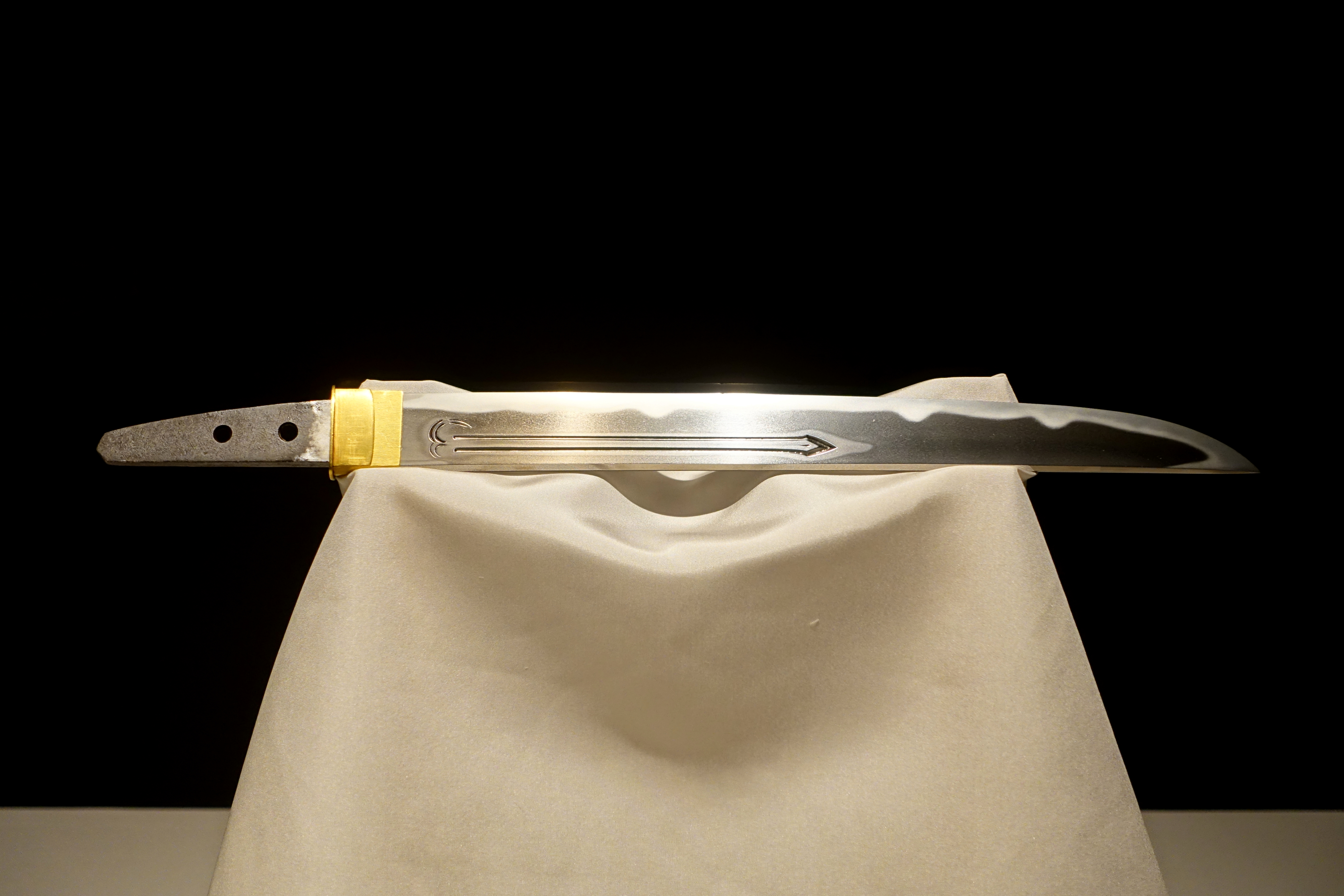
Tantō Terasawa Sadamune, by Sadamune. Kamakura period. National Treasure. Tokyo National Museum.

The tantō is a single or double edged dagger with a length between 15 and 30 cm (6 and 12 in) (1 Japanese shaku). The tantō was designed primarily as a stabbing weapon, but the edge can be used for slashing as well. Tantō are generally forged in the hira-zukuri (平造) style (without a ridgeline), meaning that their sides have no ridge line and are nearly flat, unlike the shinogi-zukuri (鎬造) structure of a katana. Some tantō have particularly thick cross-sections for armor-piercing duty, and are called yoroi toshi.

Tantō were mostly carried by samurai; commoners did not generally wear them. Women sometimes carried a small tantō called a kaiken in their obi, primarily for self-defense. Tantō were sometimes worn as the shōtō (小刀) in place of a wakizashi in a daishō, especially on the battlefield. Before the advent of the wakizashi/tantō combination, it was common for a samurai to carry a tachi and a tantō as opposed to a katana and a wakizashi.

It has been noted that the tachi would be paired with a tantō and later the katana would be paired with another shorter katana. With the advent of the katana, the wakizashi was eventually chosen by samurai as the short sword of choice over the tantō. Kanzan Satō, in his book The Japanese Sword, notes that there did not seem to be any particular need for the wakizashi, and suggests that the wakizashi may have become more popular than the tantō due to the wakizashi being more suited for indoor fighting. He mentions the custom of leaving the katana at the door of a castle or palace when entering while continuing to wear the wakizashi inside.

== History of tantō in Japan ==
The production of swords in Japan is divided into specific time periods:

- Jōkotō (ancient swords, until around 900 AD)
- Kotō (old swords from around 900–1596)
- Shintō (new swords 1596–1780)
- Shinshintō (new new swords 1781–1876)
- Gendaitō (modern swords 1876–1945)
- Shinsakutō (newly made swords 1953–present)

=== Heian to Muromachi periods ===
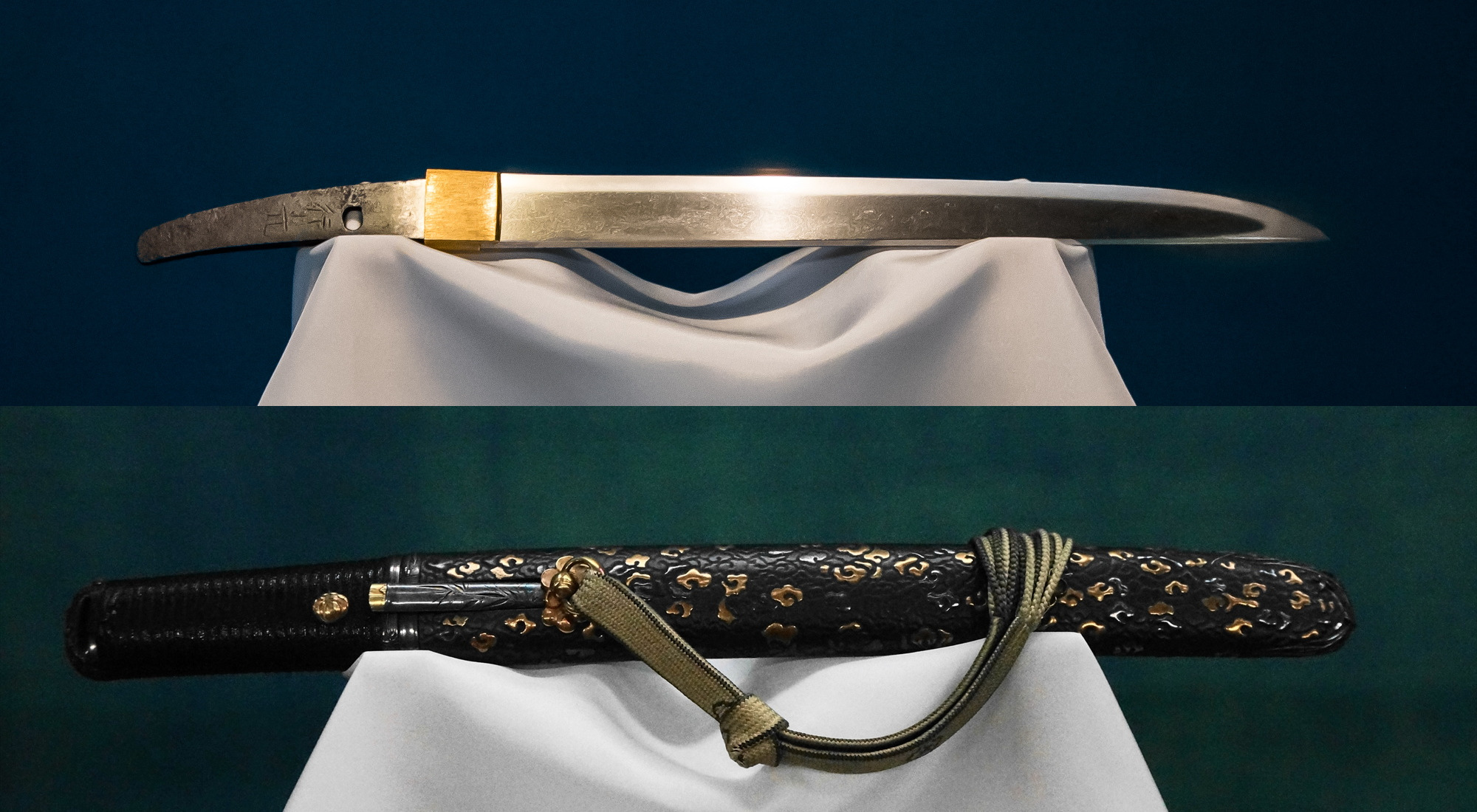
Tantō made by Soshu Yukimitsu. Kamakura period. National Treasure (top). Mounting for a tantō made by Soshu Yukimitsu. Edo period (bottom), Tokyo National Museum

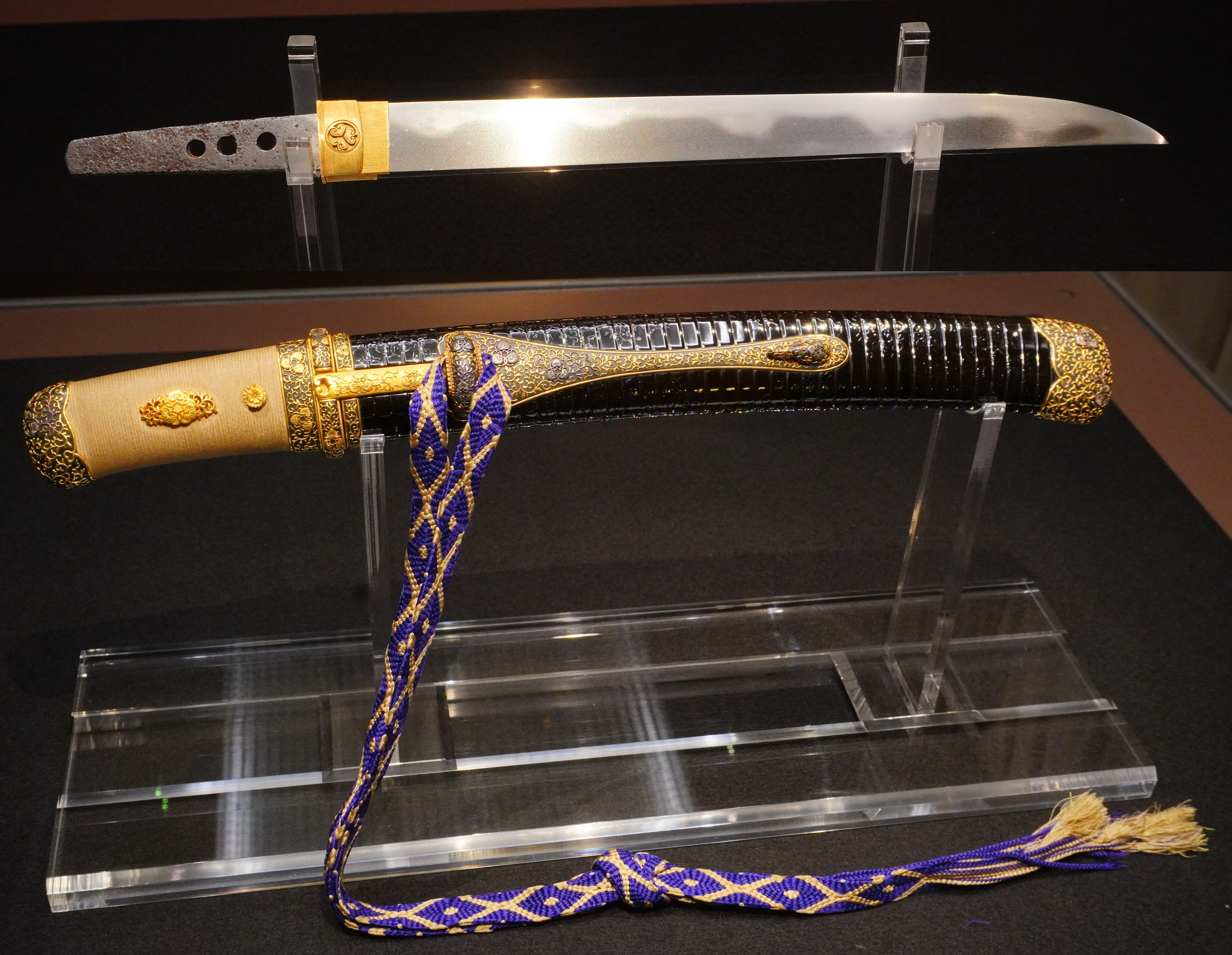
Tantō Hyuga Masamune with koshirae (mounting) and kumihimo cord, National Treasure, Mitsui Memorial Museum

The tantō was invented partway through the Heian period. With the beginning of the Kamakura period, tantō were forged to be more aesthetically pleasing, and hira and uchi-sori tantō became the most popular styles. Near the middle of the Kamakura period, more tantō artisans were seen, increasing the abundance of the weapon, and the kanmuri-otoshi style became prevalent in the cities of Kyoto and Yamato. Because of the style introduced by the tachi in the late Kamakura period, tantō began to be forged longer and wider. The introduction of the Hachiman faith became visible in the carvings in the hilts around this time. The hamon (line of temper) is similar to that of the tachi, except for the absence of choji-midare, which is nioi and utsuri. Gunomi-midare and suguha are found to have taken its place.

During the era of the Northern and Southern Courts, the tantō were forged to be up to 40 centimetres (16 in) in length, as opposed to the normal one shaku (about 30 cm (12 in)) length. The blades became thinner between the ura and the omote, and wider between the ha and mune. At this point in time, two styles of hamon were prevalent: the older style, which was subtle and artistic, and the newer, more popular style. With the beginning of the Muromachi period, constant fighting caused the mass production of blades, meaning that with higher demand, lower-quality blades were manufactured. Blades that were custom-forged still were of exceptional quality, but the average blade suffered greatly. As the end of the period neared, the average blade narrowed and the curvature shallowed.

Katana originate from sasuga (刺刀), a kind of tantō used by lower-ranking samurai who fought on foot in the Kamakura period. Their main weapon was a long naginata, with the sasuga as a spare weapon. In the Nanboku-chō period, which corresponds to the early Muromachi period, long weapons such as ōdachi were popular, and along with this, the sasuga lengthened, taking its form as the katana.

=== Momoyama to the early Edo period ===
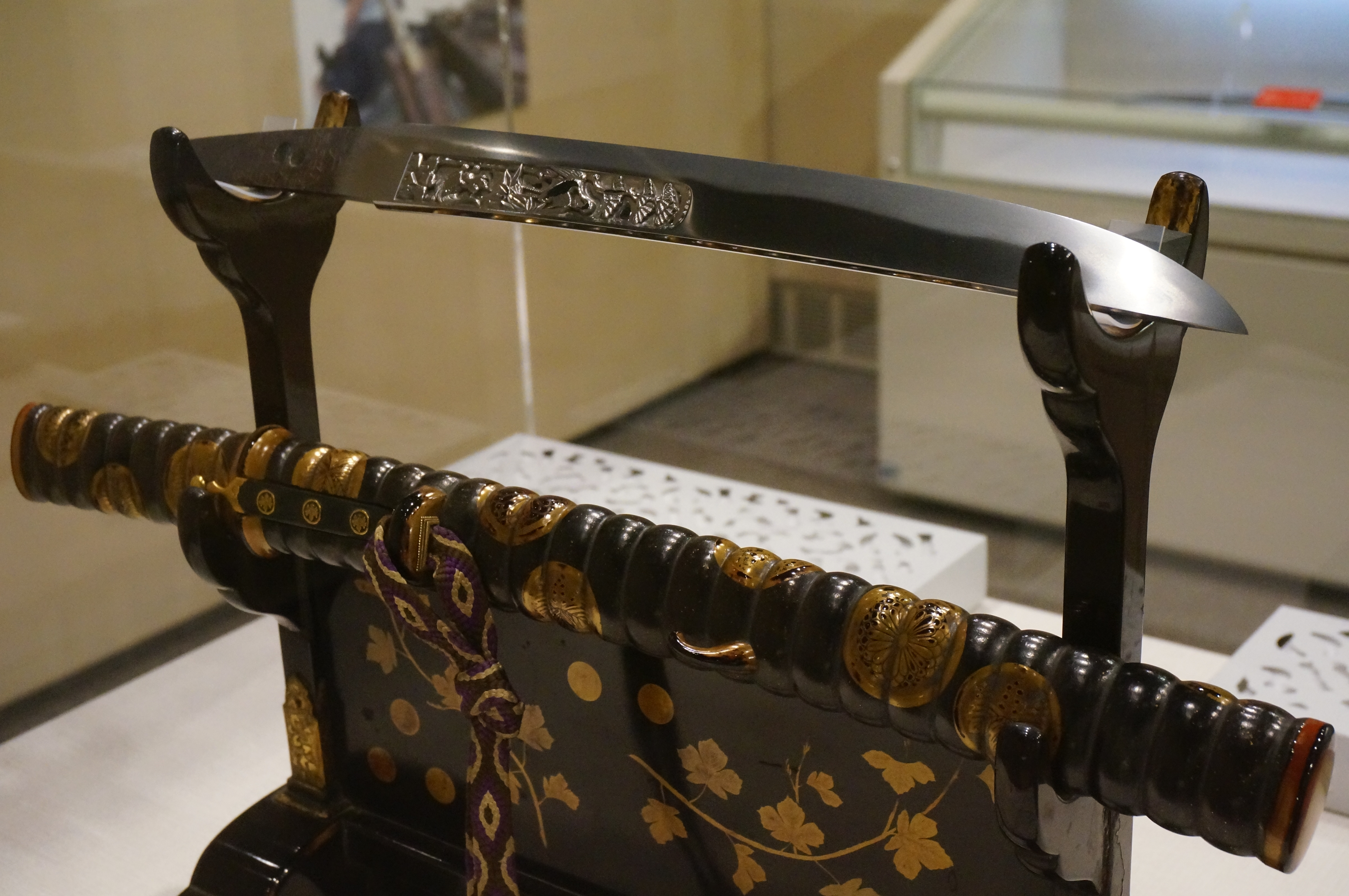
The tantō "Hōraisan Kotetsu" forged by Nagasone Kotetsu is one of the Nihon santō.

Approximately 250 years of peace accompanied the unification of Japan, in which there was little need for blades. In this period, both the katana and wakizashi were invented, taking the place of the tantō and tachi as the most-used pair of weapons, and the number of tantō forged was severely decreased. Since this period, tantō have often been carved with splendid decorations. Of the tantō and wakizashi forged during this period, three masterpieces are called the Nihon santō (Three Blades in Japan).

=== Late Edo period ===
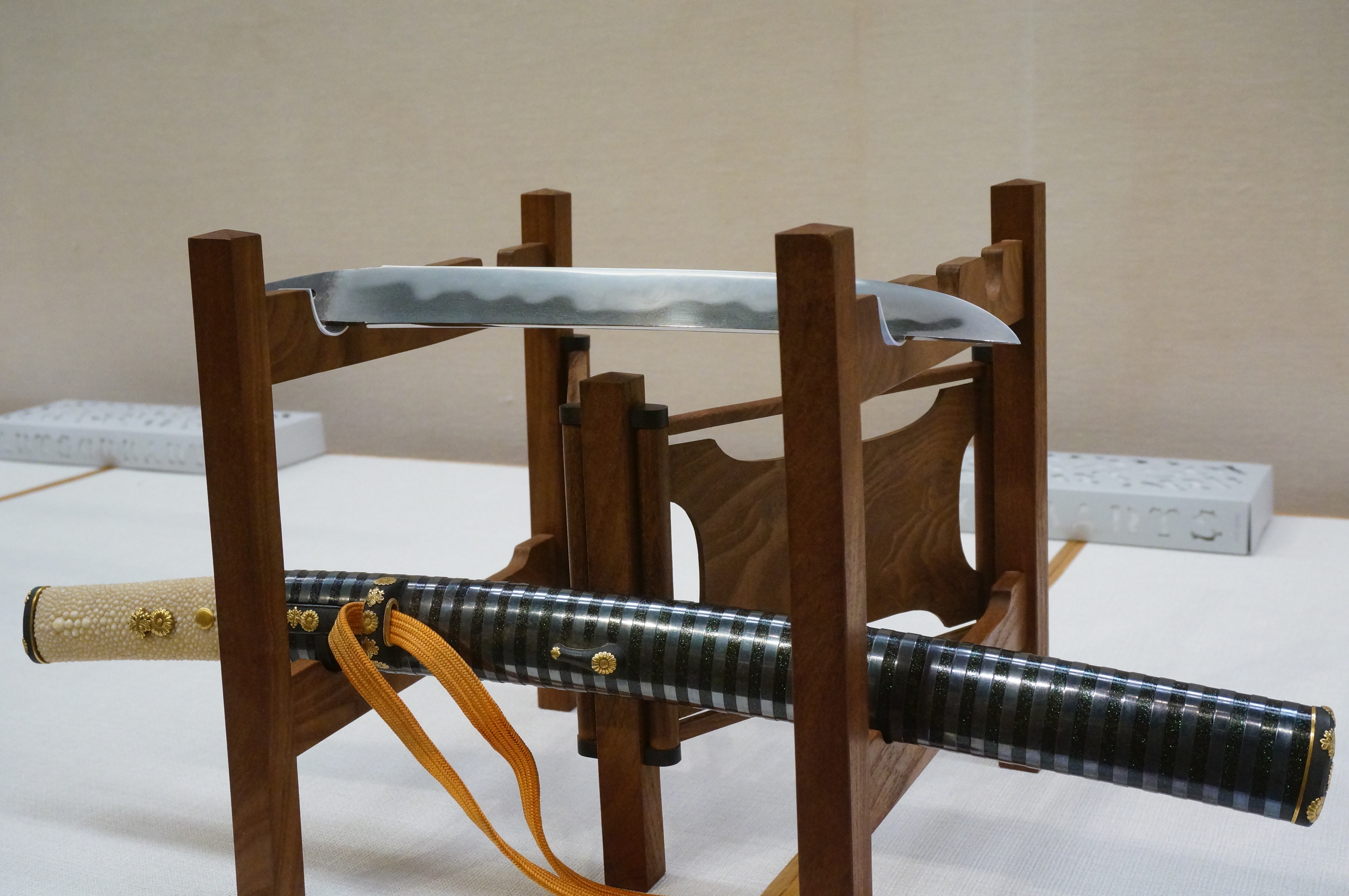
In the Edo period, decorative mountings were attached to old tantō. A tantō forged by Hasebe Kunishige. Nanboku-chō period (top); tantō mounting, late Edo period (bottom).

There were still a few tantō being forged during the late Edo period, and the ones that were forged reflected the work of the Kamakura, Nambokucho, or Muromachi eras. Suishinshi Masahide was a main contributor towards the forging of tantō during this age. There were now only tantō predating the Edo period being used in combat; tantō forged during the late Edo period were not combative weapons.

=== Meiji to present ===
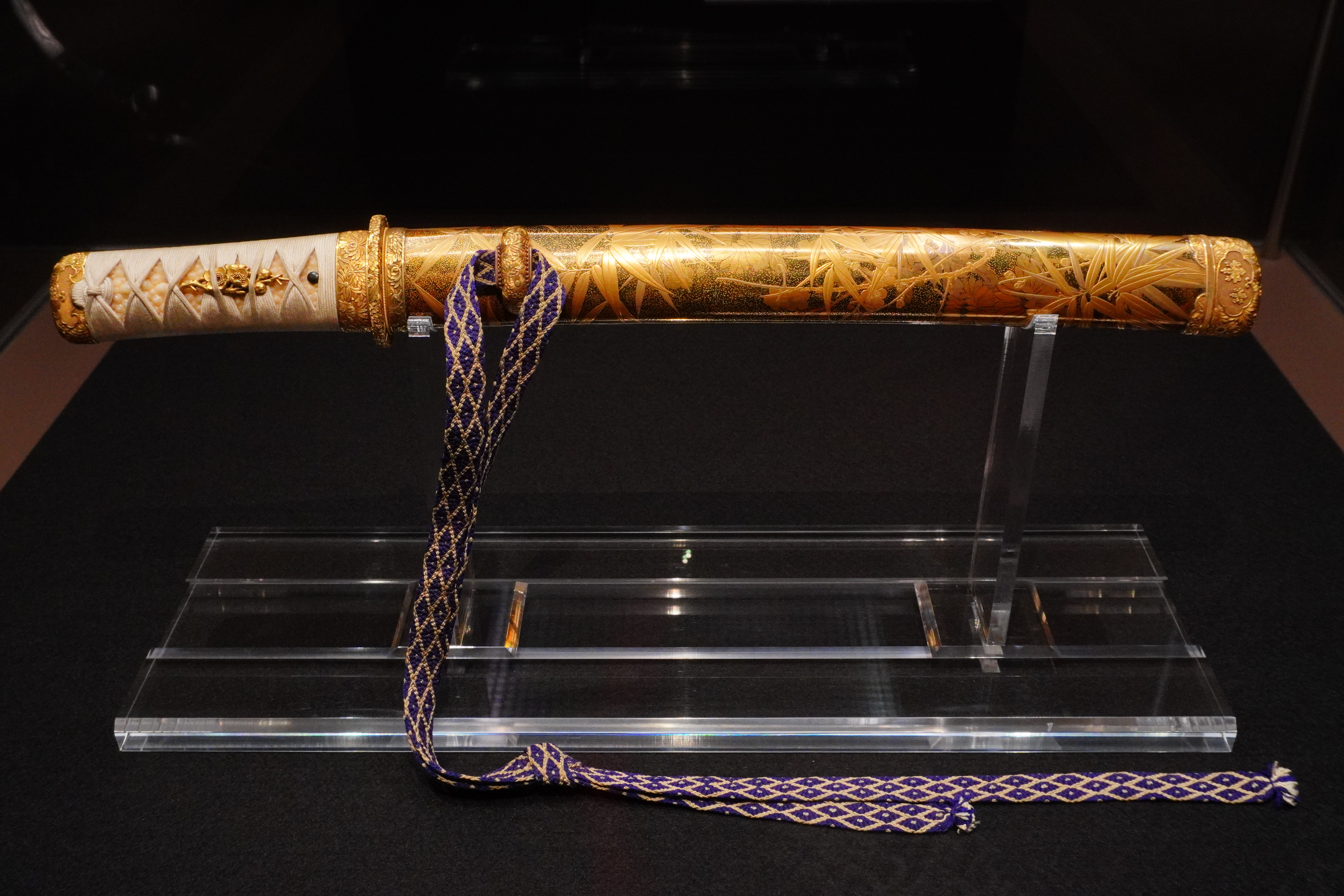
Tantō koshirae in the style of a short wakizashi from the Bakumatsu or Meiji era (19th century), Mitsui Memorial Museum

Many tantō were forged before World War II, due to the restoration of the Emperor to power. Members of the Imperial Court began wearing the set of tachi and tantō once more, and the number of tantō in existence increased dramatically. After World War II, a restriction on sword forging caused tantō manufacture to fall drastically.

Tantō remained in use among twentieth century yakuza (gangsters) since they could be carried as a concealed weapon more easily than a katana. A tantō is also traditionally used in the yubitsume ritual (cutting off part of a finger as an act of submission or atonement).

American and European interest in Japanese martial arts since the war created a demand for the tantō outside Japan from the 1960s through the present time.

== Types of tantō ==
=== Blade types ===
The general blade shape is approximately 25 cm (9.8 in) long, 17 mm (0.67 in) wide (near the tang), 8 mm (0.31 in) thick (near the tang) and approximately straight. Actual historical examples would vary in length, width, thickness and curvature. (The hira and kiriha sides of the katakiriha blade have been swapped to allow the tip to point consistently to the left while still showing the chisel-like side.)

- Hira (平): A very common tantō form with no shinogi, the edge bevels reaching all the way from the edge (ha) to the back (mune) with no separate flats in between, creating an almost triangular cross-section (the back is ridged, as on most other blade forms, so the cross-section is actually an extremely asymmetrical diamond shape; on shinogi zukuri blades it is hexagonal). It is extremely common due to the simplicity of its design.
- Shinogi (鎬): This is the most common type of blade geometry for long swords, but tantō made in this form are very rare, usually created from cut-down blades when a longer sword has been broken. Shinogi means the central ridge that runs along the length of the blade between the edge bevels and the body of the blade.
- Osoraku: Osoraku zukuri feature an extremely long o-kissaki type point, over half the blade's length.
- Shōbu (菖蒲): A common blade type that is very similar to the shinogi zukuri, except that it lacks a yokote, the distinct angle between the long cutting edge and the point section, and instead the edge curves smoothly and uninterrupted into the point.
- Unokubi (鵜首): An uncommon tantō style akin to the kanmuri-otoshi, with a back that grows abruptly thinner around the middle of the blade; however, the unokubi zukuri regains its thickness just before the point. There is normally a short, wide groove extending to the midway point on the blade.
- Kanmuri-otoshi: These tantō were shaped in the hira or shōbu style, but from about halfway to the tip the back edge was sharpened though this second edge was not particularly sharp. They had a groove running halfway up the blade and were similar to the unokubi-style tantō.
- Kissaki-moroha (切先両刃): A rare blade type with a double-edged point. Unlike the later kanmuri-otoshi the tip had a distinct shape unlike any other tantō: the back edge would curve slightly downwards so that the point was lower than the back of the blade whereas other tantō had the point in line with the back of the blade. Often they had a wide groove in the base half. The most well known historical blade of this type is the tachi Kogarasu Maru, "Little Crow", one of the National Treasures of Japan.
- Moroha (両刃): A rare, double-edged tantō type that has a diamond-shaped cross-section. The blade tapers to a point and contains a shinogi that runs to the point.
- Yoroi tōshi (鎧通し; or yoroi dōshi): tantō that have particularly thick cross-sections for armor-piercing duty.
- Katakiriha (片切刃): An asymmetric tantō form, sharpened only on one side to create a chisel-shaped cross-section.
- Kubikiri (首切り): A very rare type; the sharpened blade is on the inside curve rather than the outside. It has no sharpened point, making it difficult to use in battle and enshrouding the weapon in mystery. Kubikiri means 'head cutter'. According to one myth, they were carried by attendants of samurai for cutting off the heads of fallen enemies. There are other speculations existing about the kubikiri's possible uses. Perhaps they were used by doctors or carried by high-ranking officials as a badge is worn today. They could also have been used for cutting charcoal or incense, or used as an artistic tool for pruning bonsai trees.
- Hōchōgata (包丁形): A tantō form that is commonly described as a short, wide, hira. The hōchōgata ('kitchen knife-shaped') was one of the blade type that the legendary swordsmith Masamune favored.

=== Mountings (koshirae) ===
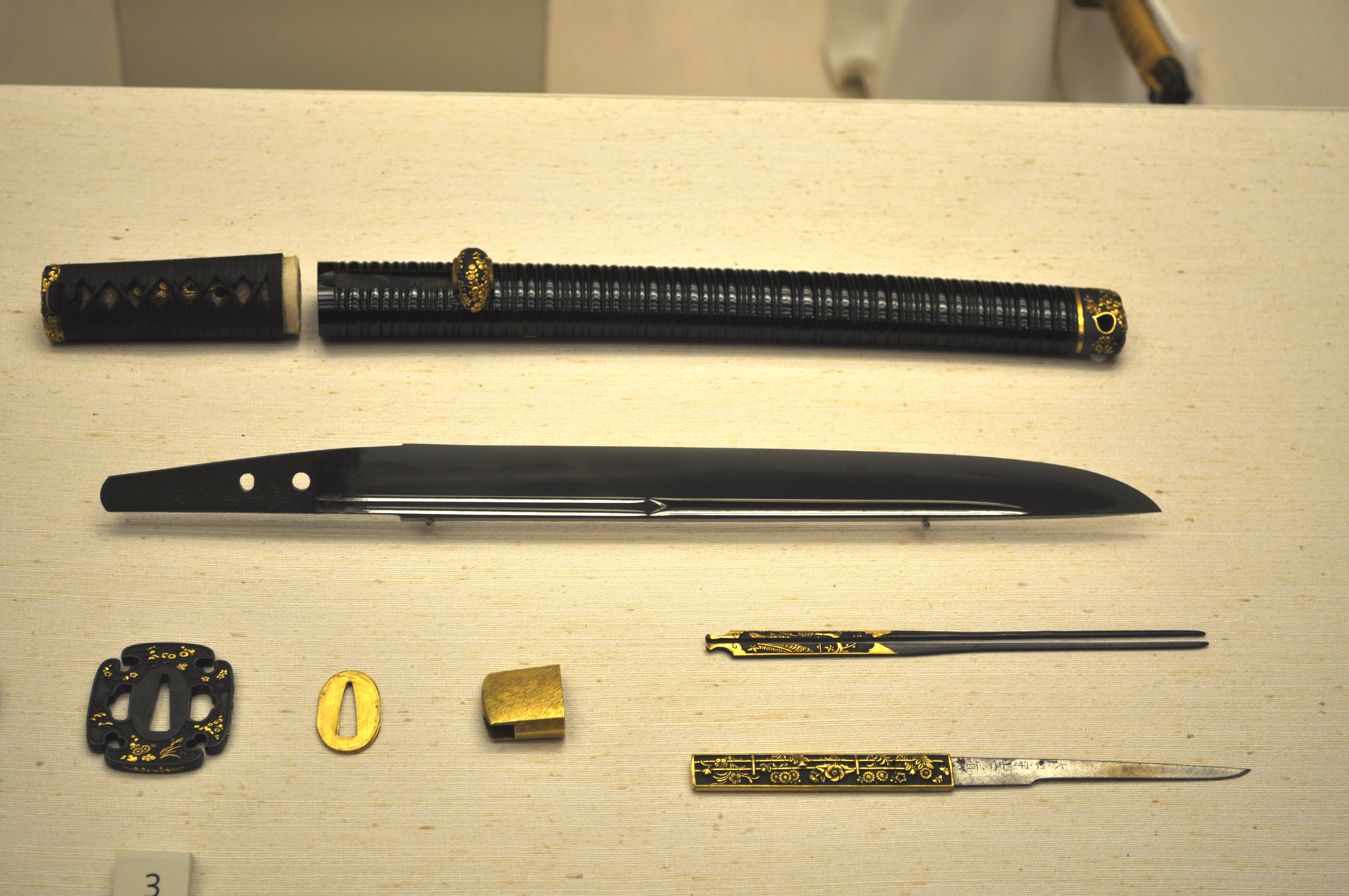
Antique Japanese tantō shown dis-assembled, with Kozuka and Kogai, British Museum

- Aikuchi (合口): The aikuchi is a tantō koshirae where the fuchi is flush with the mouth of the sheath. There is no handguard. Aikuchi normally have plain wooden hilts, and many forms of aikuchi have kashira that are made from animal horns.
- Hamidashi: The hamidashi is a tantō koshirae that features a small handguard.

=== Western Tanto ===
A popular style of blade, known simply as a Tanto in the US and Europe, is similar in style to the Tantō except that the tip is squared at a shearing angle instead of curved.

The shearing angle may facilitate the stabbing effectiveness of the blade, and make the process of sharpening simpler.

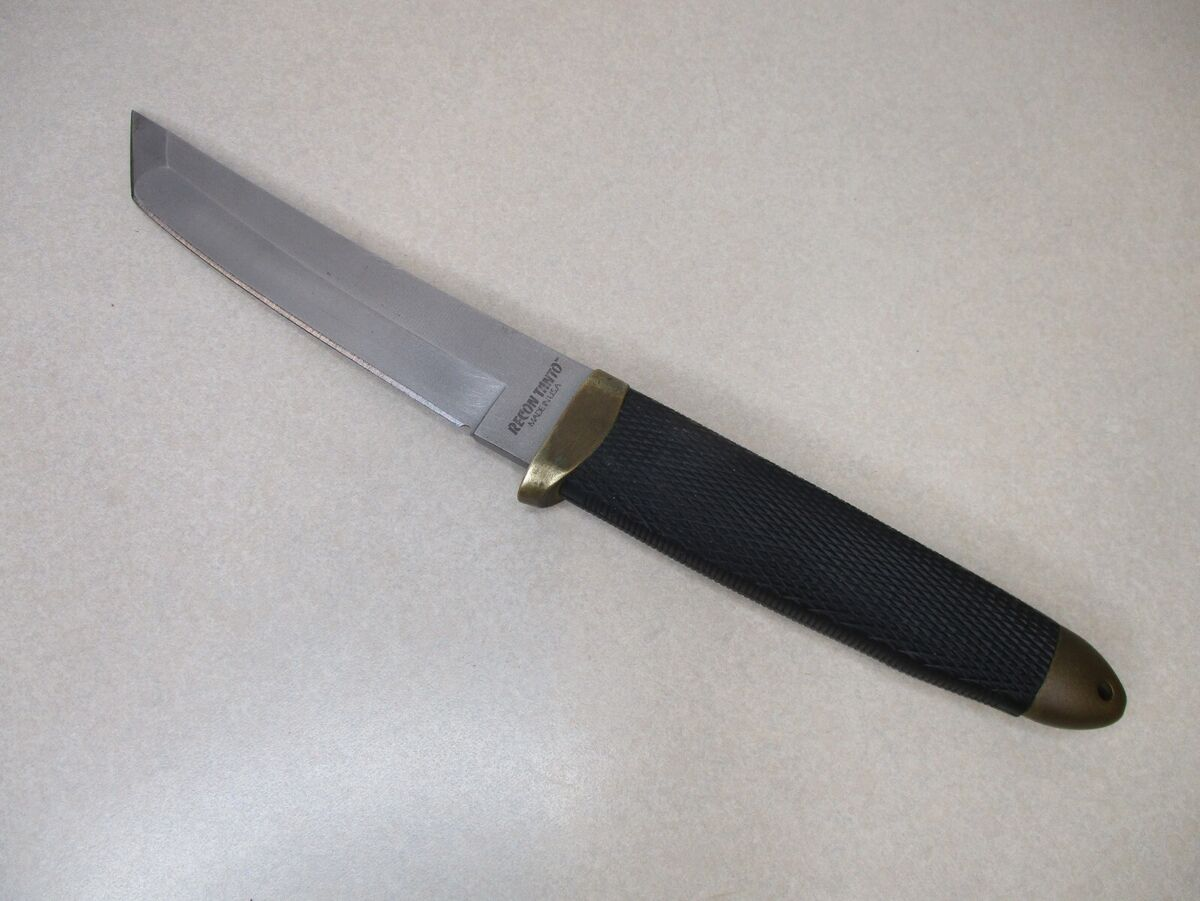
An American style Tanto knife

This style of blade is commercially popular, and was used by CIA field agents in the wake of 9/11.

The Bundeswehr is among the few militaries that issues a "tantō"-style military knife in significant numbers. It is designated as the KM2000.

=== Other tantō ===
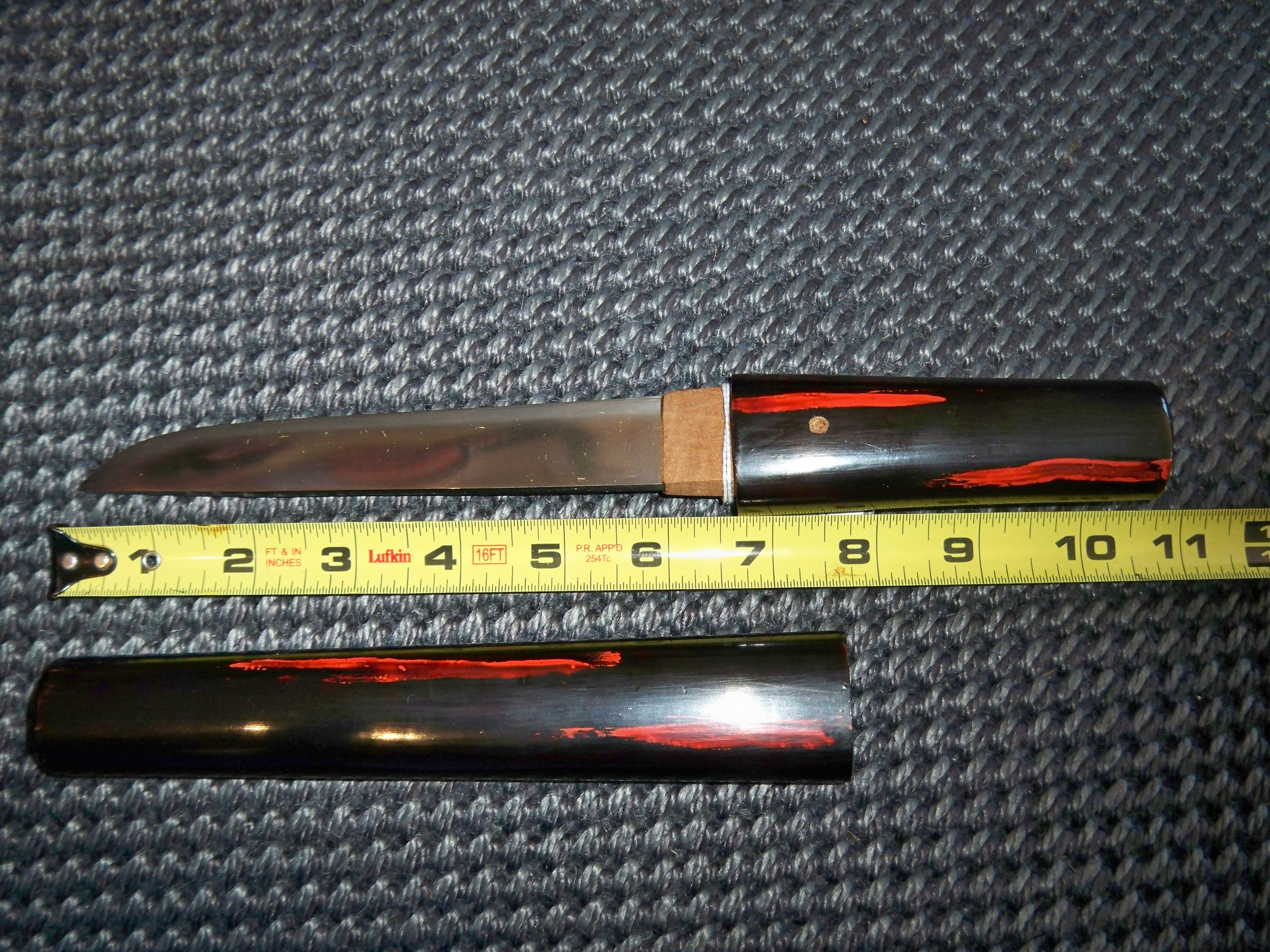
Kaiken tantō

- Kaiken tantō: The kuaiken (also kwaiken or futokoro-gatana) is a generally short tantō that is commonly carried in aikuchi or shirasaya mounts. It was useful for self-defense indoors where the long katana and intermediate wakizashi were inconvenient. Women carried them in the obi for self-defense and rarely for seppuku (ritual suicide). A woman received a kaiken as part of her wedding gifts.
- Fan tantō: The fan tantō is a common tantō with a blade entirely concealed within a fan-shaped scabbard. The blade was usually low quality, as this tantō was not designed to be a display piece, but rather a concealed weapon for self-defense.
- Yari tantō: Japanese spearheads were often altered so that it became possible to mount them as tantō. Unlike most blades, yari tantō had triangular cross-sections. The primary purpose of the yari tantō was to pierce kusari (chain mail).
- Ken tantō: This is also not truly a tantō, though it is often used and thought of as one. Ken were straight, double-edged blades often used for Buddhist rituals, and could be made from spearheads that were broken or cut shorter. They were often given as offerings from sword smiths when they visited a temple. The hilt of the ken tantō may be found made with a vajra (double thunderbolt related to Buddhism).
- Modern tantō: Modern tactical knives have been made by knife makers Bob Lum, Phill Hartsfield, Ernest Emerson, Allen Elishewitz, Bob Terzuola, Strider Knives, Harold J. "Kit" Carson, Benchmade, Camillus Cutlery Company, Spyderco, Severtech, Ka-Bar, SOG Knives, Columbia River Knife & Tool, and Cold Steel. These "American tantō" designs which are often folding knives, feature a thick spine on the blade that goes from the tang to the tip for increased tip strength. The handle shape may be altered slightly to provide better ergonomics.

== Use in martial arts ==
Tantō with blunt wooden or blunt plastic blades are used to practice martial arts. Versions with a blunt metal blade are used in more advanced training and in demonstrations. Martial arts that employ the tantō include:

- Aikido
- Aikijutsu
- Jujutsu
- Wadō-ryū (both tantō and katana)
- Koryu bujutsu
- Ninjutsu
- Shorinji Kempo
- Modern Arnis (taking place of dagger)

== Gallery ==
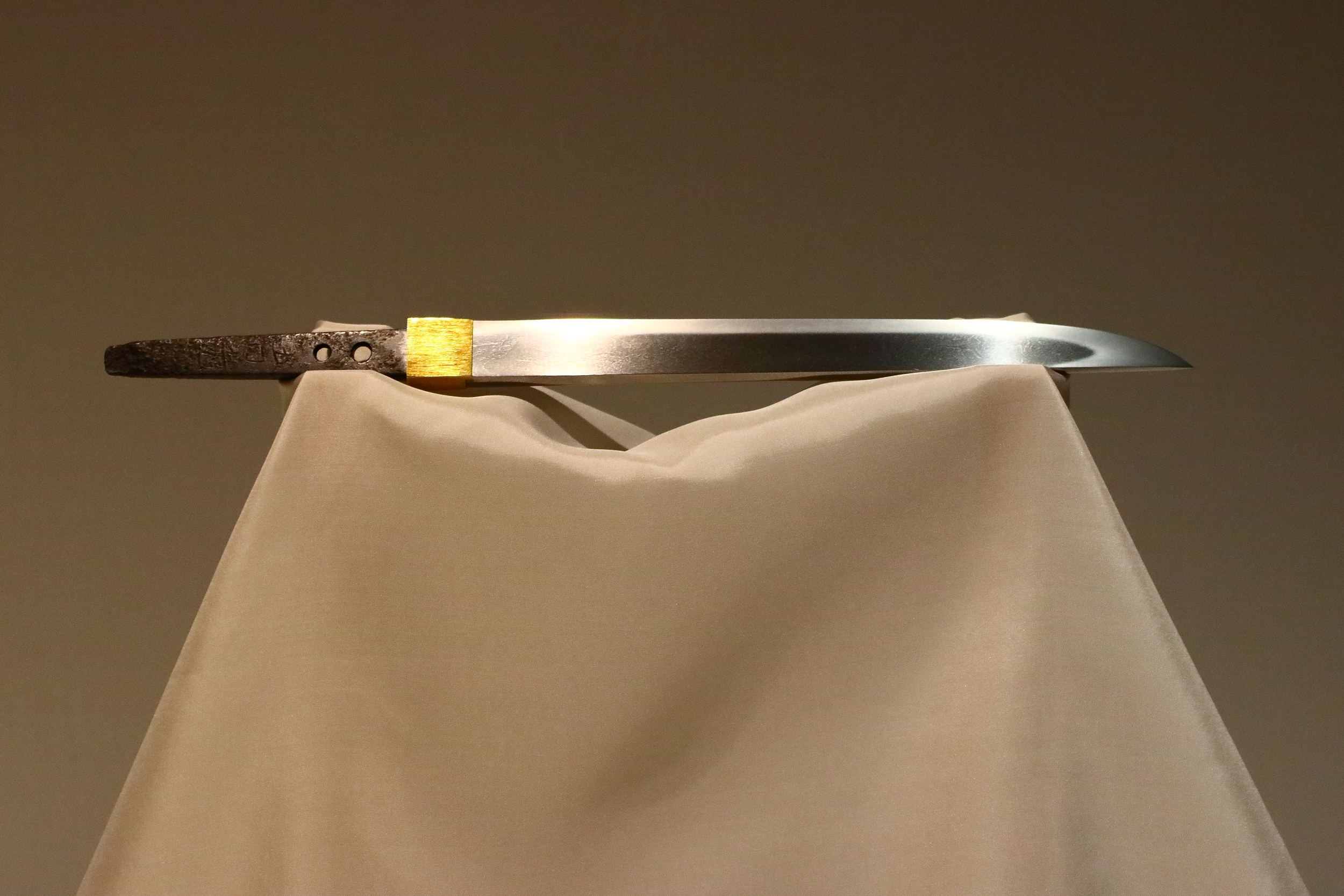
Tantō Atsushi Tōshirō, by Awataguchi Yoshimitsu. 13th century, Kamakura period. National Treasure. Tokyo National Museum

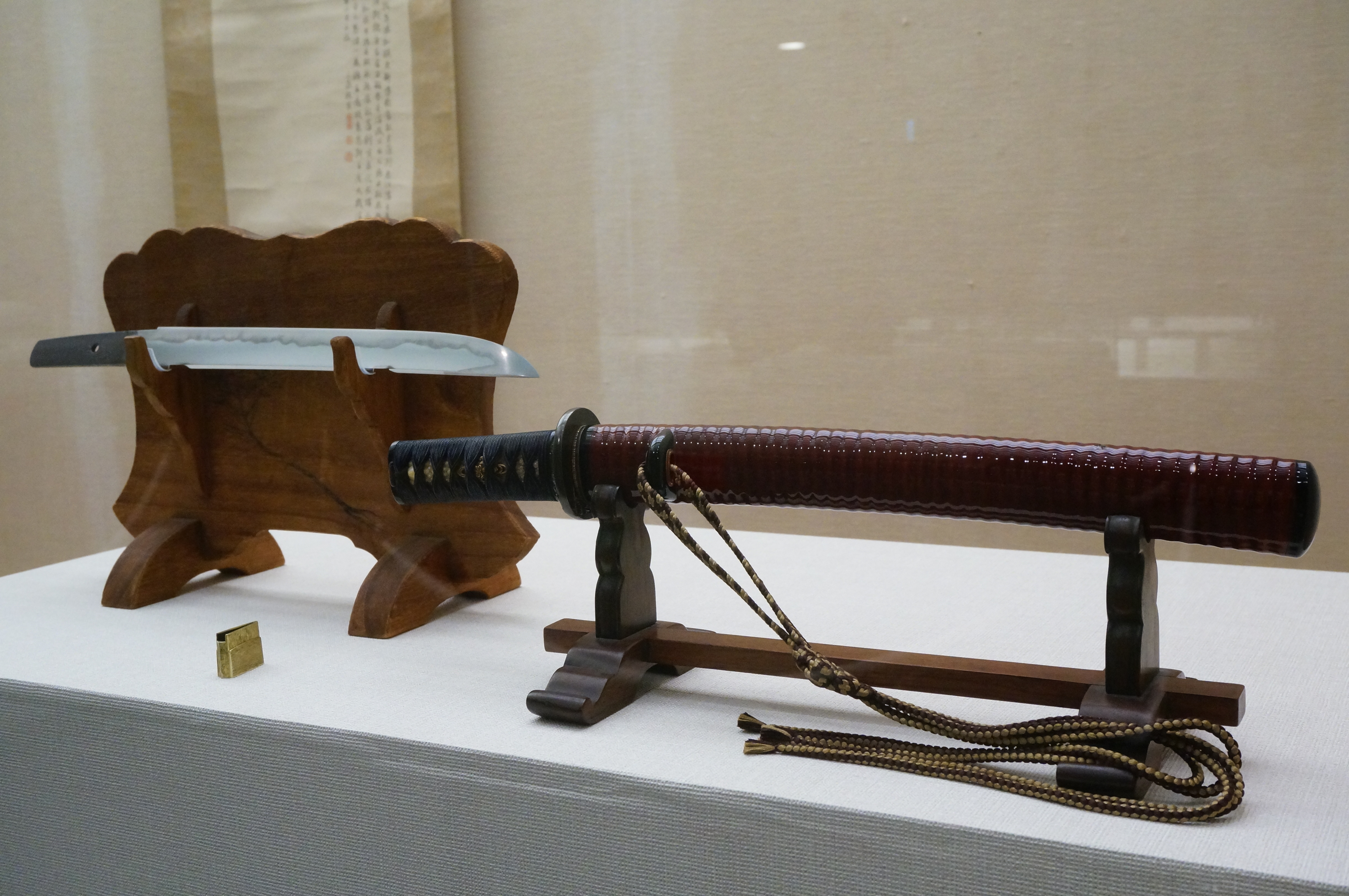
A tantō forged by Minamoto Kiyomaro (left), tantō mounting (right). Late Edo period.

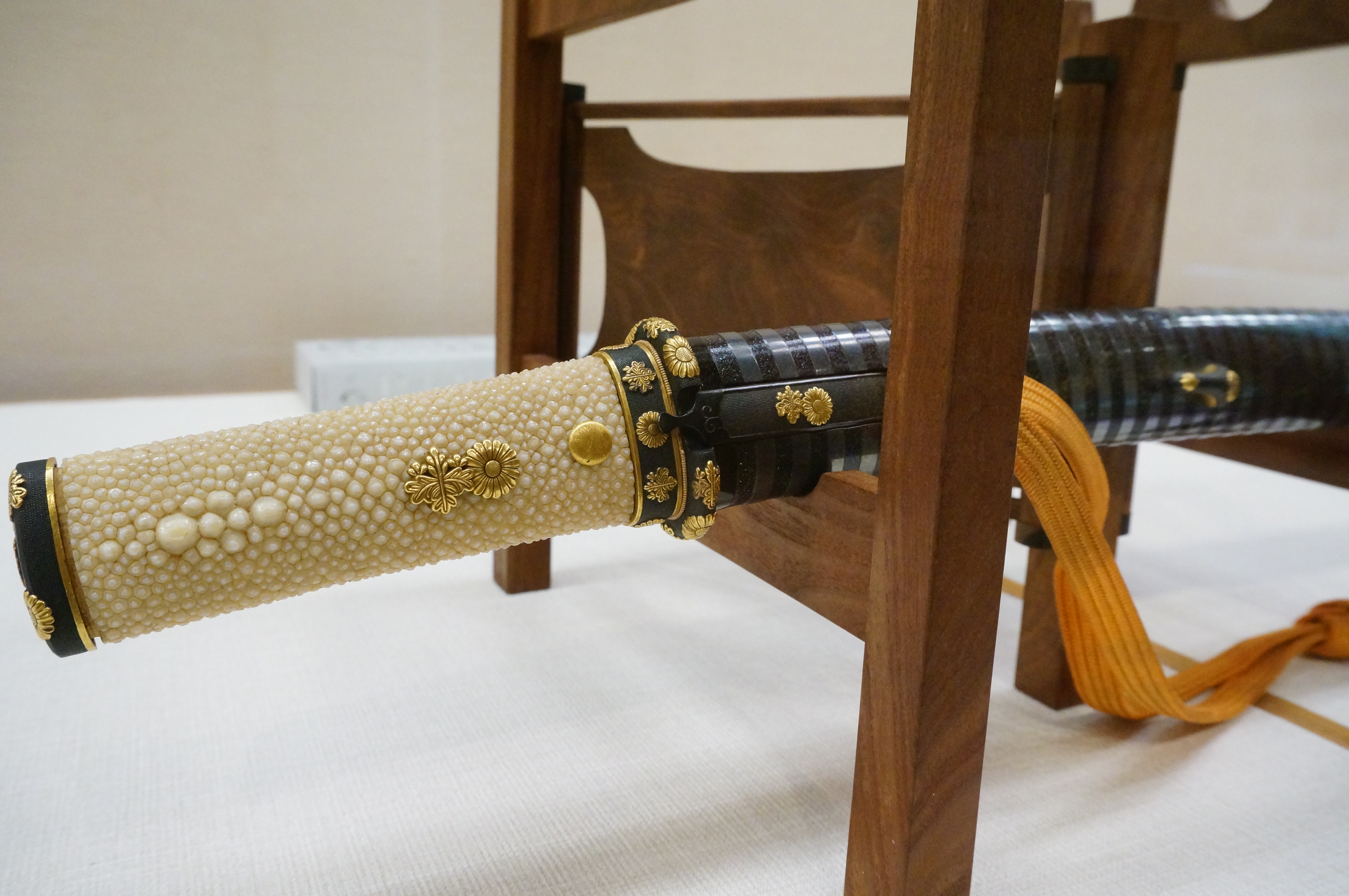
Hilt (tsuka) and handguard (tsuba) of tantō. Late Edo period.

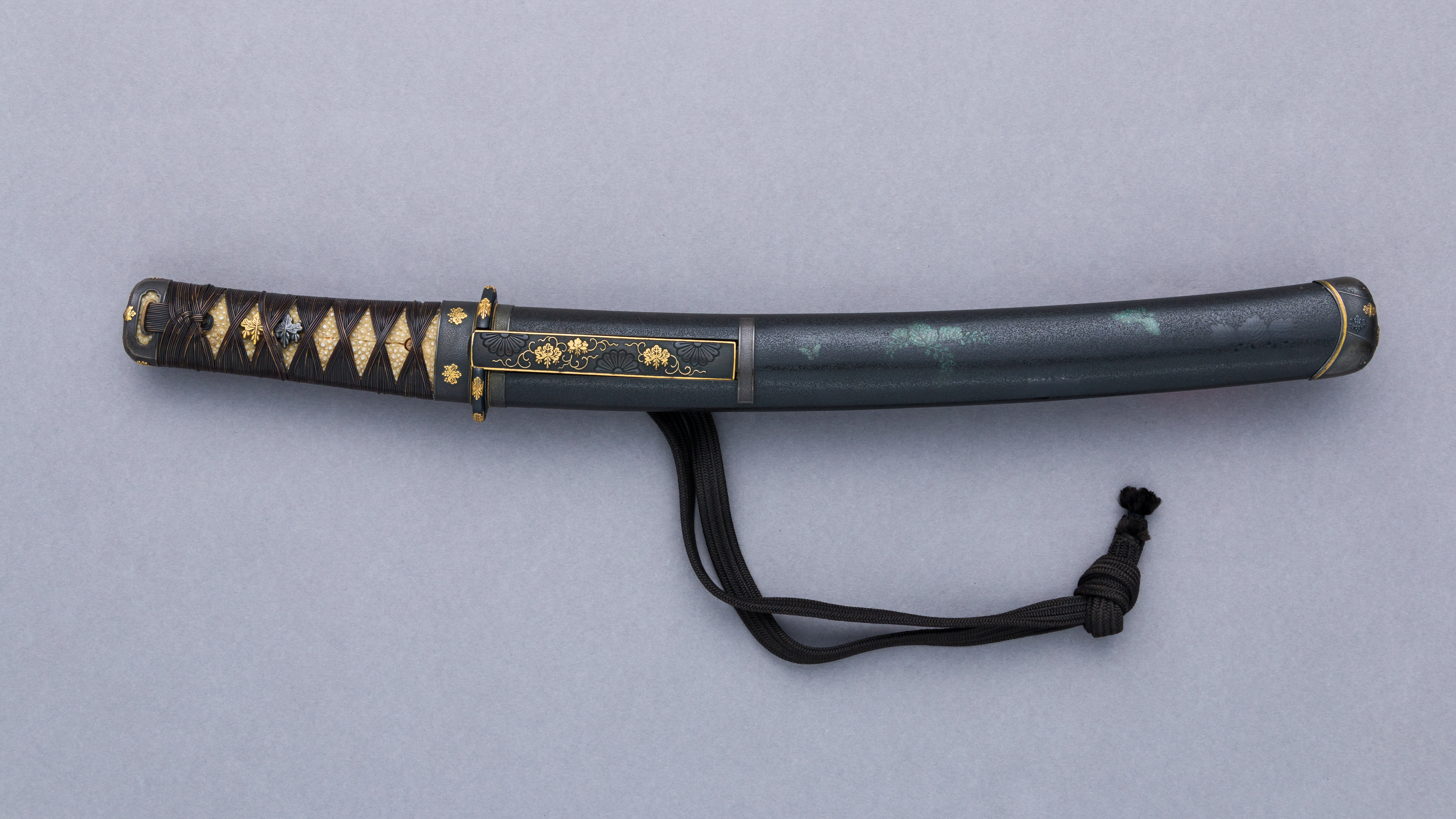
Tantō mounting. Edo or Meiji period. The Metropolitan Museum of Art.

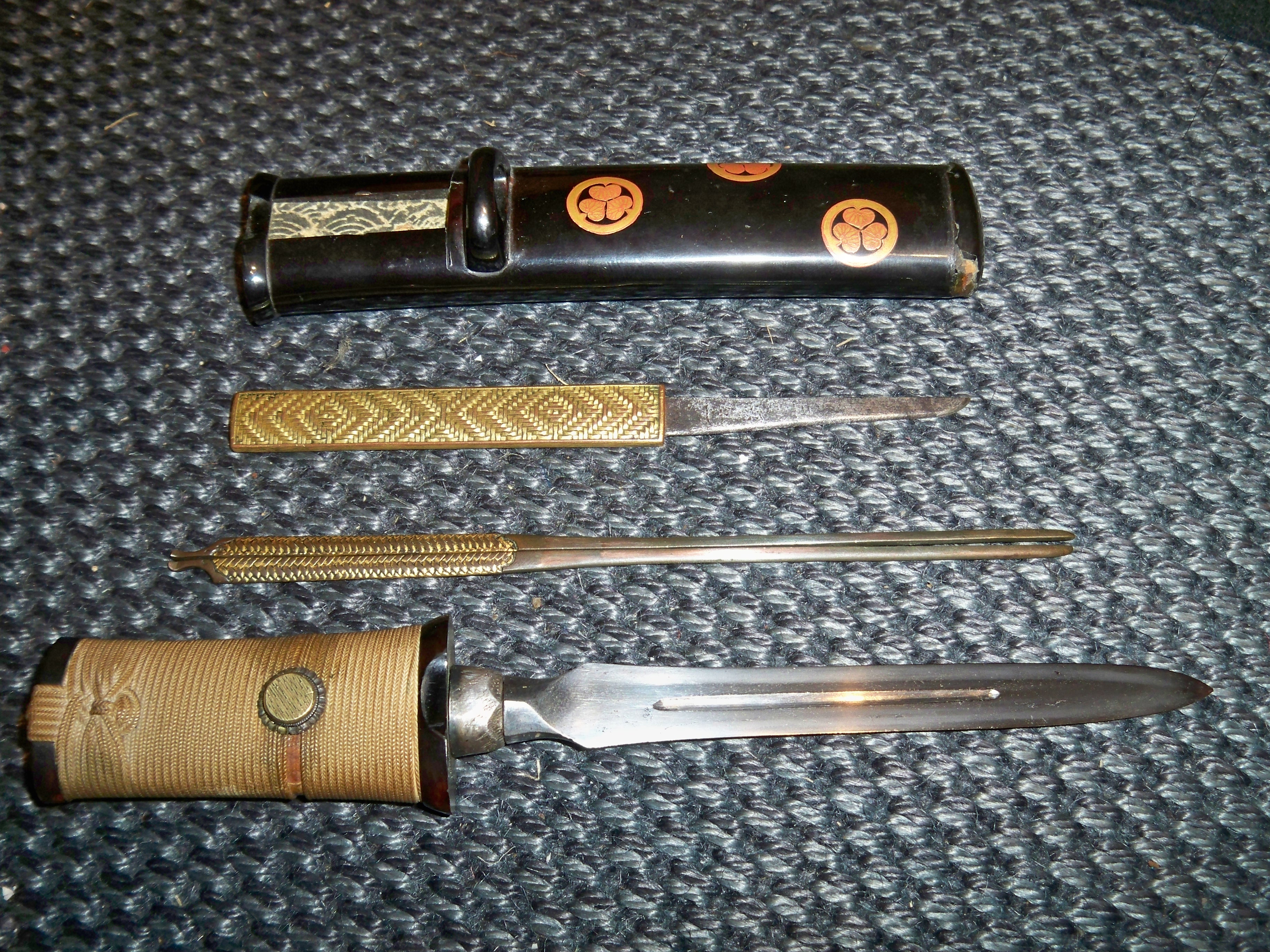
Edo period yari (spear) tantō in koshirae. A spearhead converted to use as a tantō.

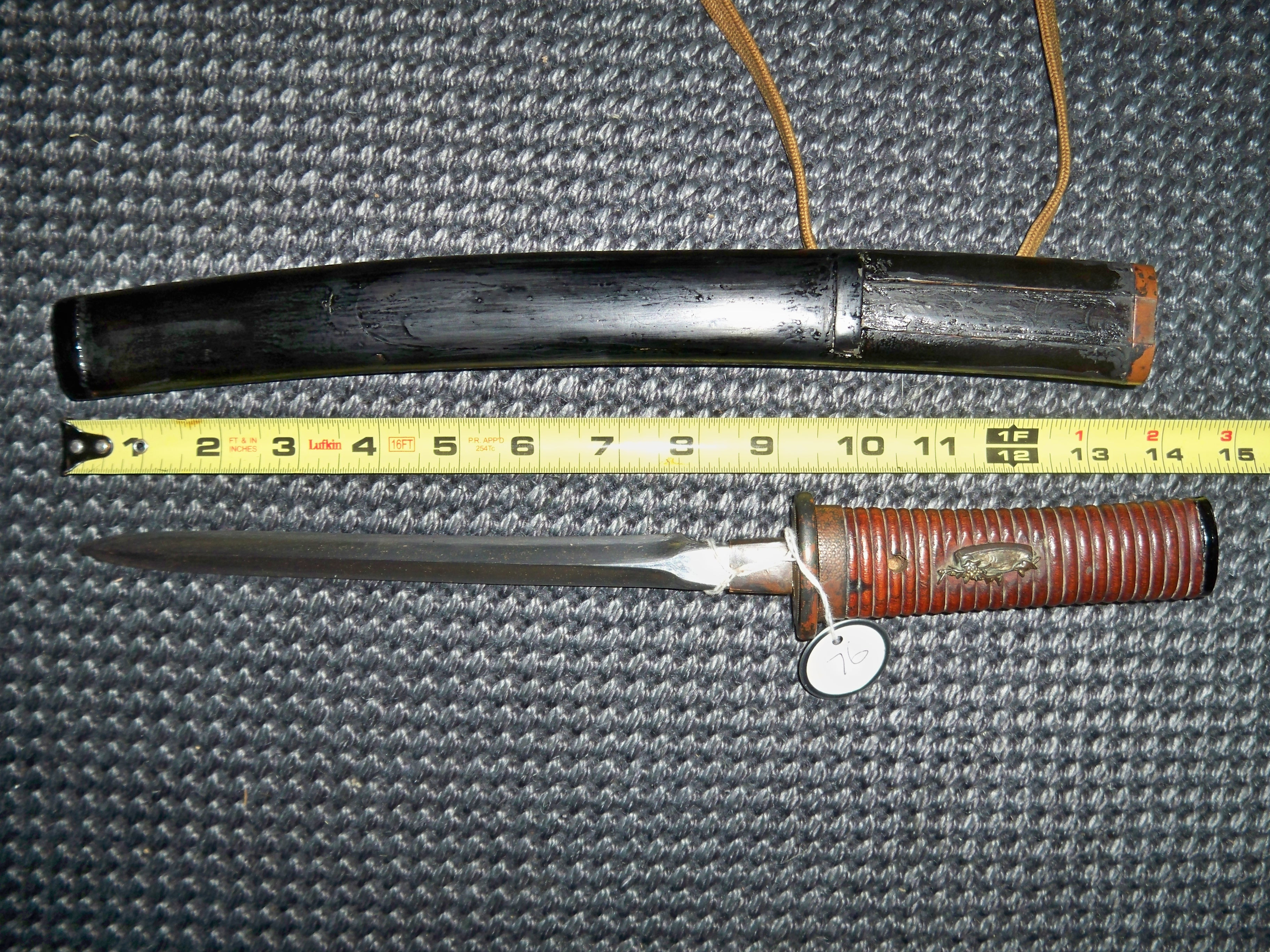
Edo period yari tantō. A yari (spear) converted to use as a tantō.

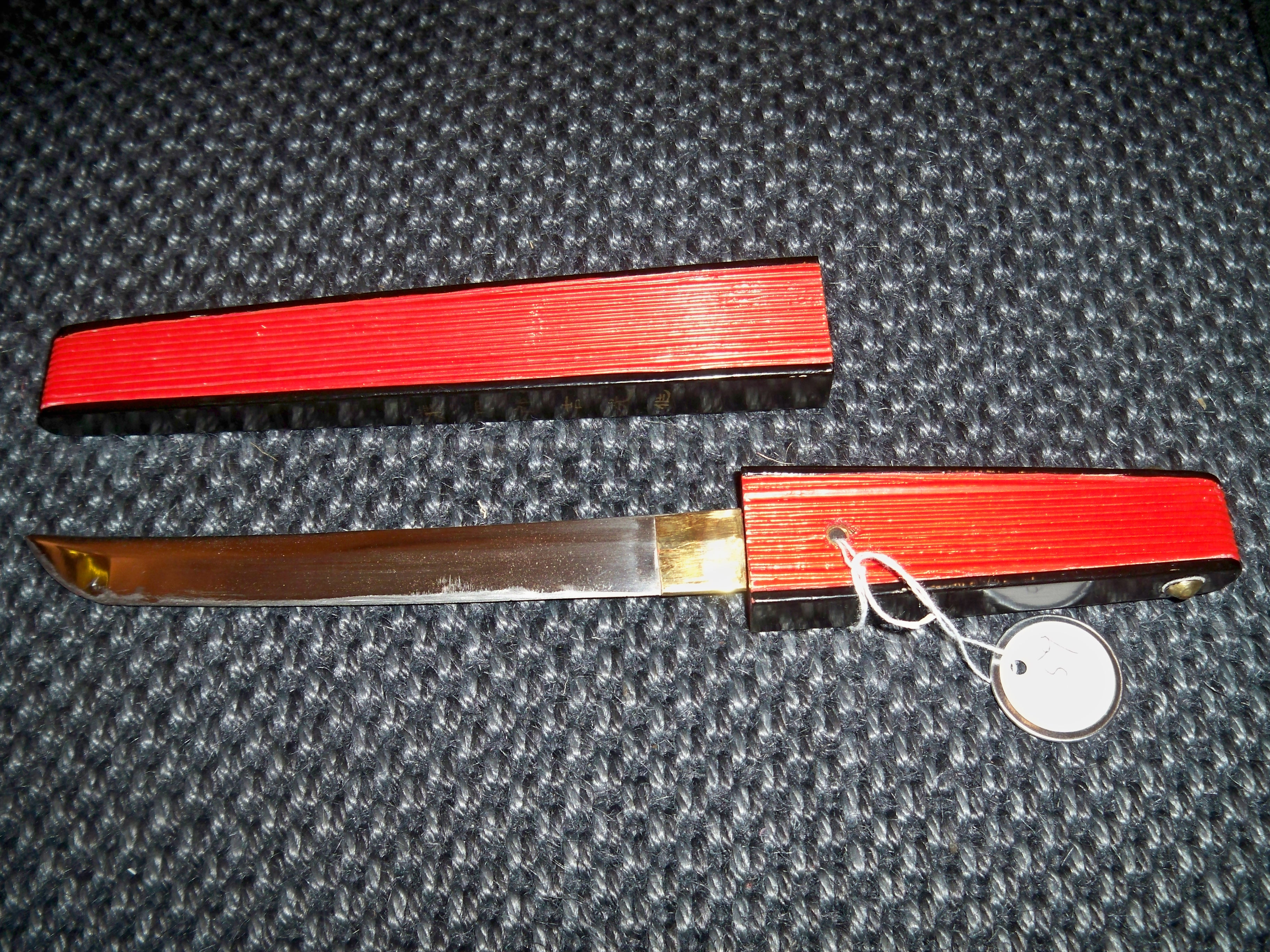
A tantō disguised as a fan

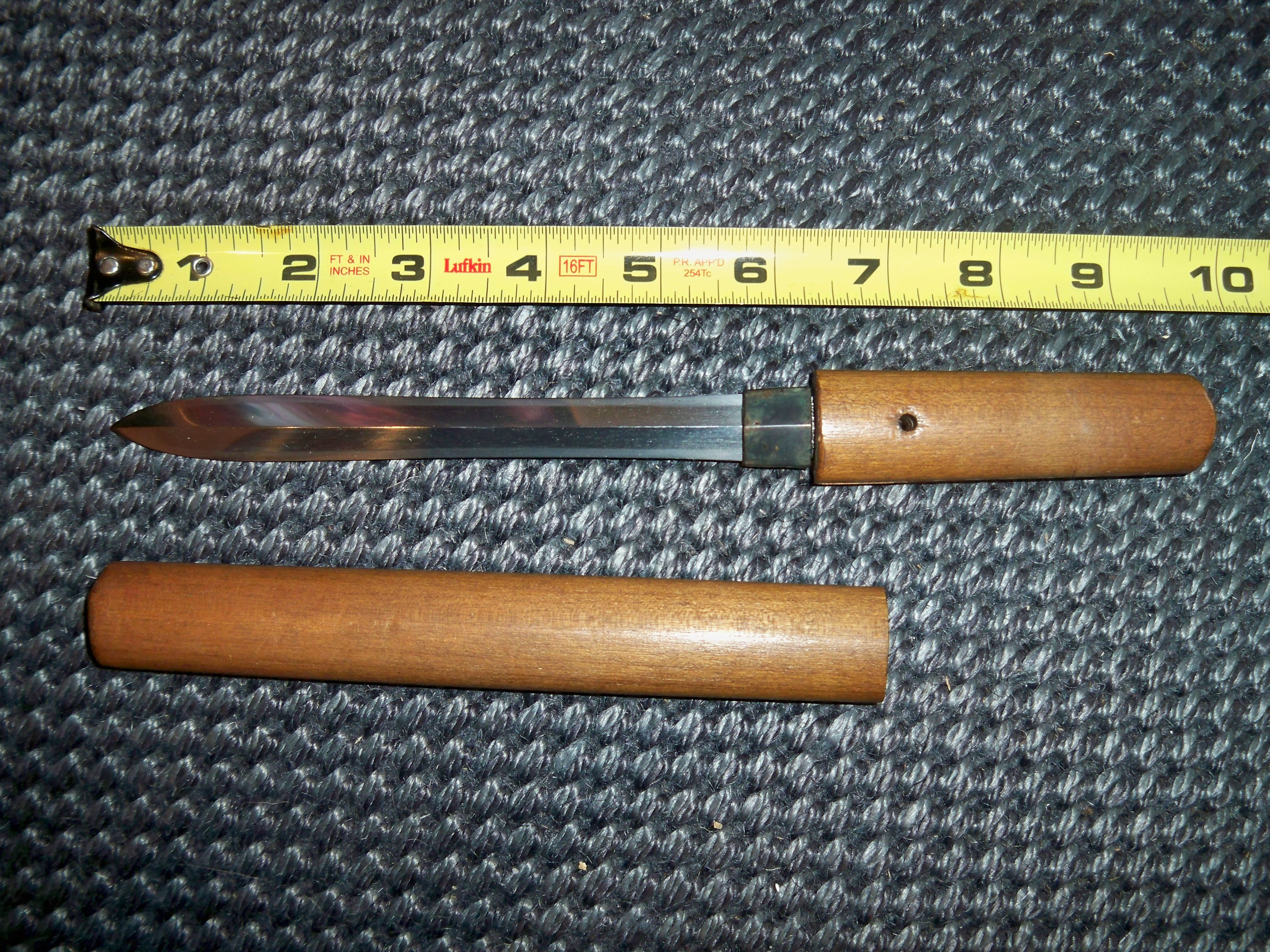
Ken tantō, a double-edged straight sword in wooden mounts shirasaya

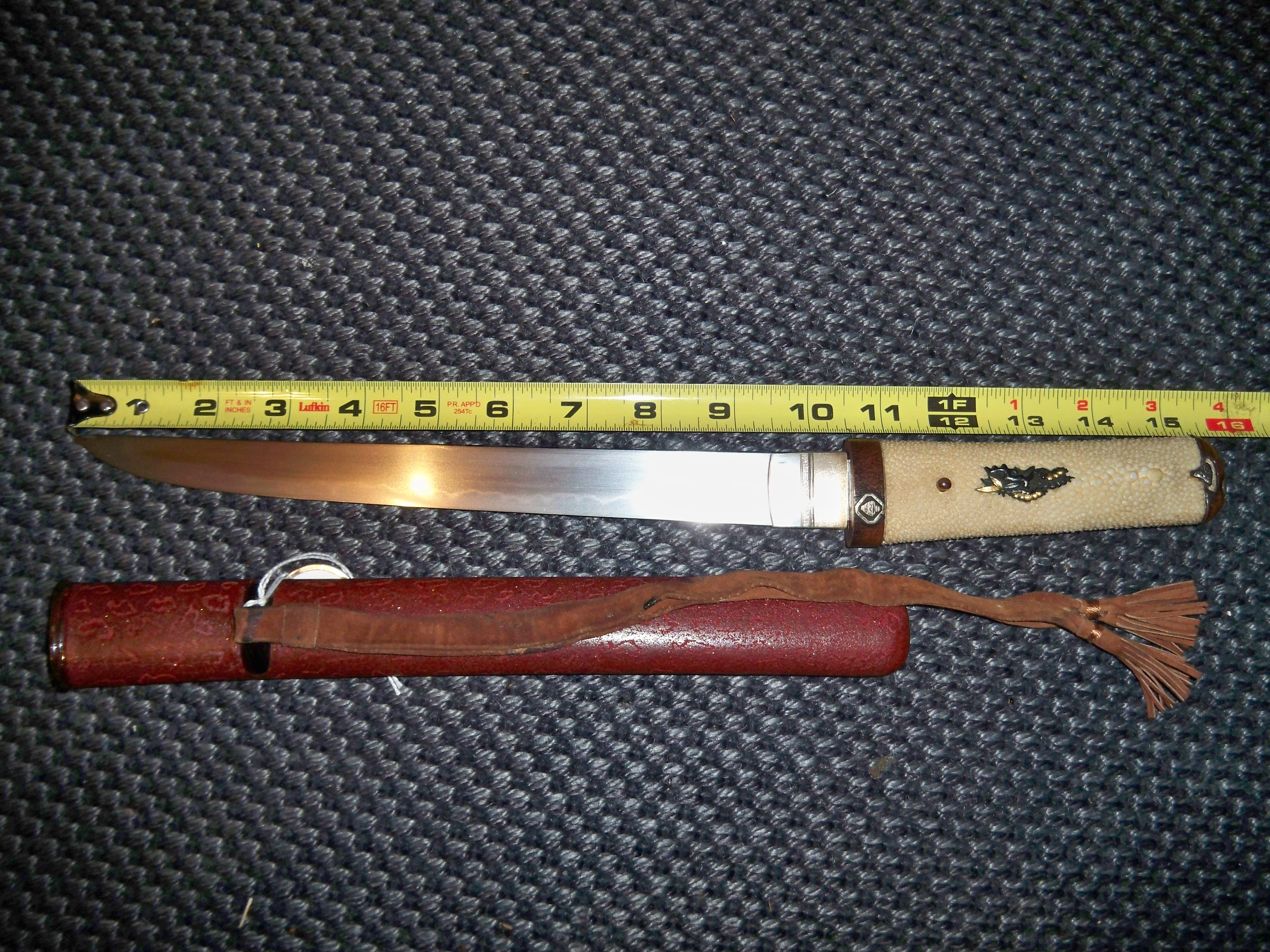
Edo period tantō with an aikuchi mounting

== See also ==
- List of daggers
- Fighting knife
- Japanese sword
