= Kaiken (dagger) =

Japanese knife

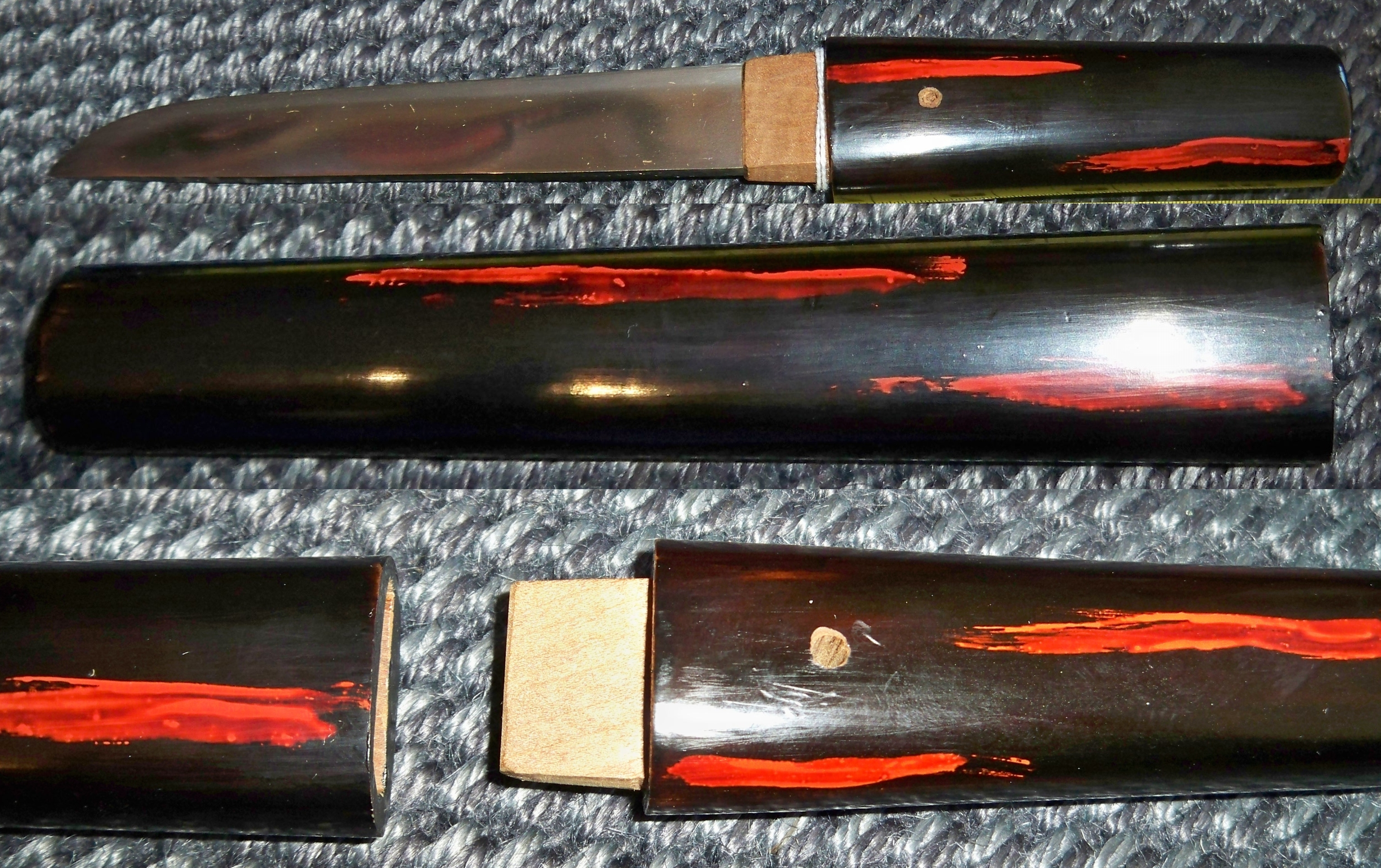
Japanese kaiken-style tantō

A kaiken (懐剣) is a 20–25 cm (7.9–9.8 in) long, single or (very rarely) double-edged Japanese knife usually without ornamental fittings housed in a plain but lacquered mount.

== Uses ==
The kaiken was once carried by men and women of the samurai class in Japan. It was useful for self-defense in indoor spaces where the long-bladed katana and intermediate-length wakizashi were inconvenient. Women carried them in their kimono either in a pocket-like space (futokoro) or in the sleeve pouch (tamoto) for self-defense and for ritual suicide by slashing the veins in the left side of the neck. When a samurai woman married, she was expected to carry a kaiken with her when she moved in with her husband. The kaiken was also carried concealed in its shirasaya by the lower classes who were not permitted to wear swords, in particular by criminals in the Edo period.

In modern Japan, a kaiken is worn as a traditional accessory for the gyōji (referee) in sumo matches for the highest ranks. However, a real blade is not used. No one legally wears or carries a kaiken today in Japan, as this is a violation of the Gun and Sword Law. They can be legally transported, however, provided they are carried together with their registration certificate.

== Orthography ==
Due to pronunciation changes over time, the blade's name has shifted from kwaiken to kaiken. The kaiken is also referred to as a futokoro-gatana or a mamori-gatana (守り刀, 'protection sword/blade').

== See also ==
- Japanese sword
- Tantō
