= Tang (blade) =

Part of the blade protruding into the handle

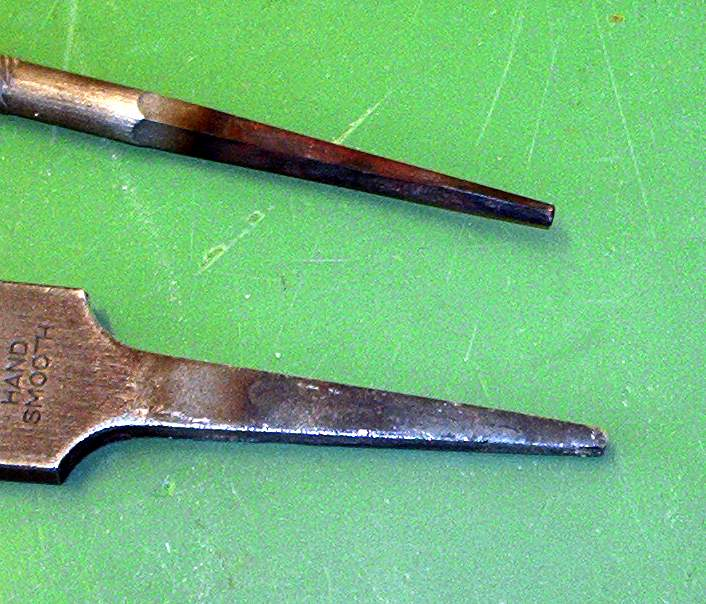
Tangs without handle

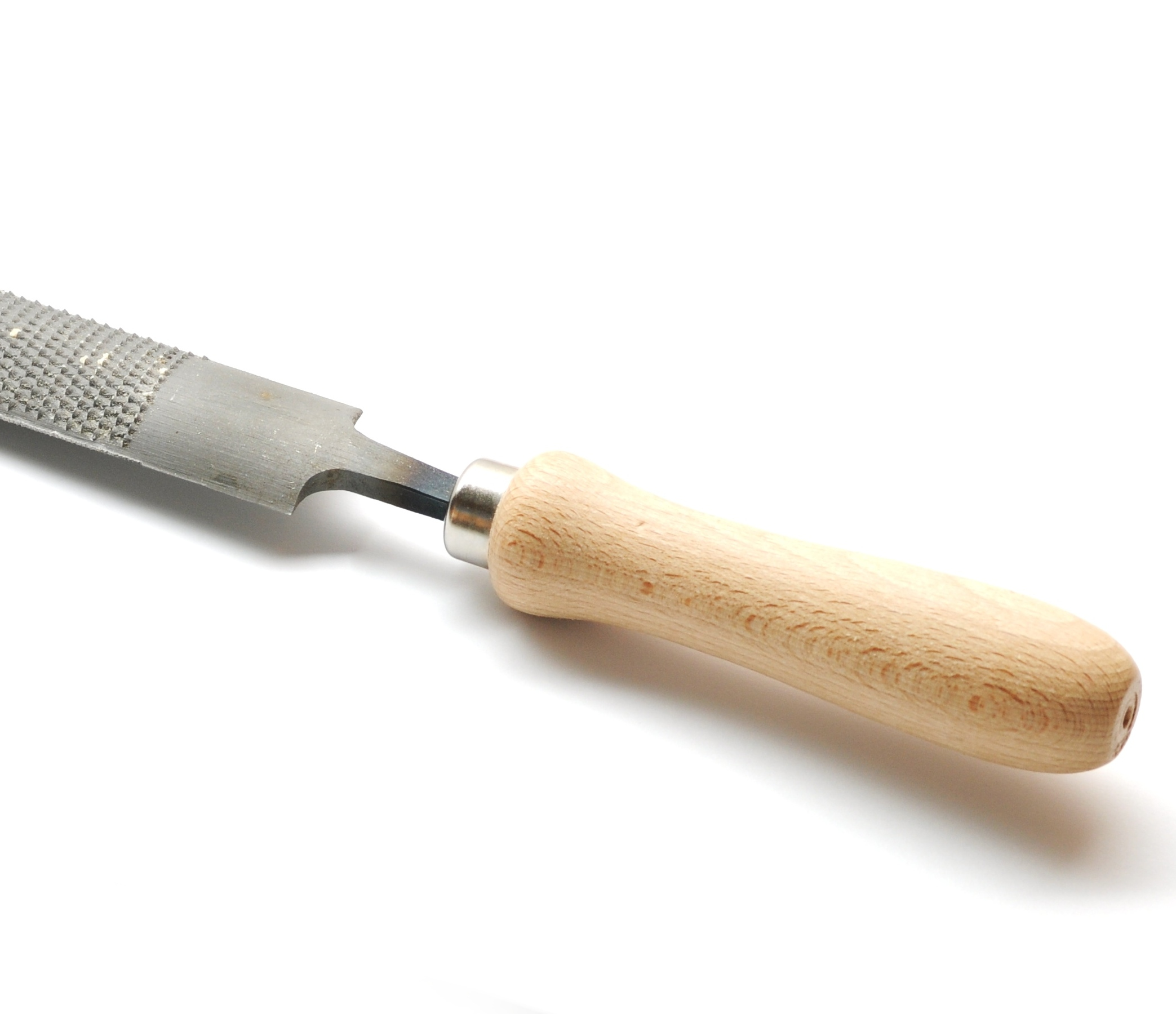
Tang with handle

A tang or shank is the back portion of the blade component of a tool or weapon where it extends into stock material or connects to a handle – as on a knife, sword, spear, arrowhead, chisel, file, coulter, pike, scythe, screwdriver, etc. One can classify various tang designs by their appearance, by the manner in which they attach to a handle, and by their length in relation to the handle.

Nakago is the term in Japanese, used especially when referring to the tang of the katana or the wakizashi.

== Full vs partial tang ==
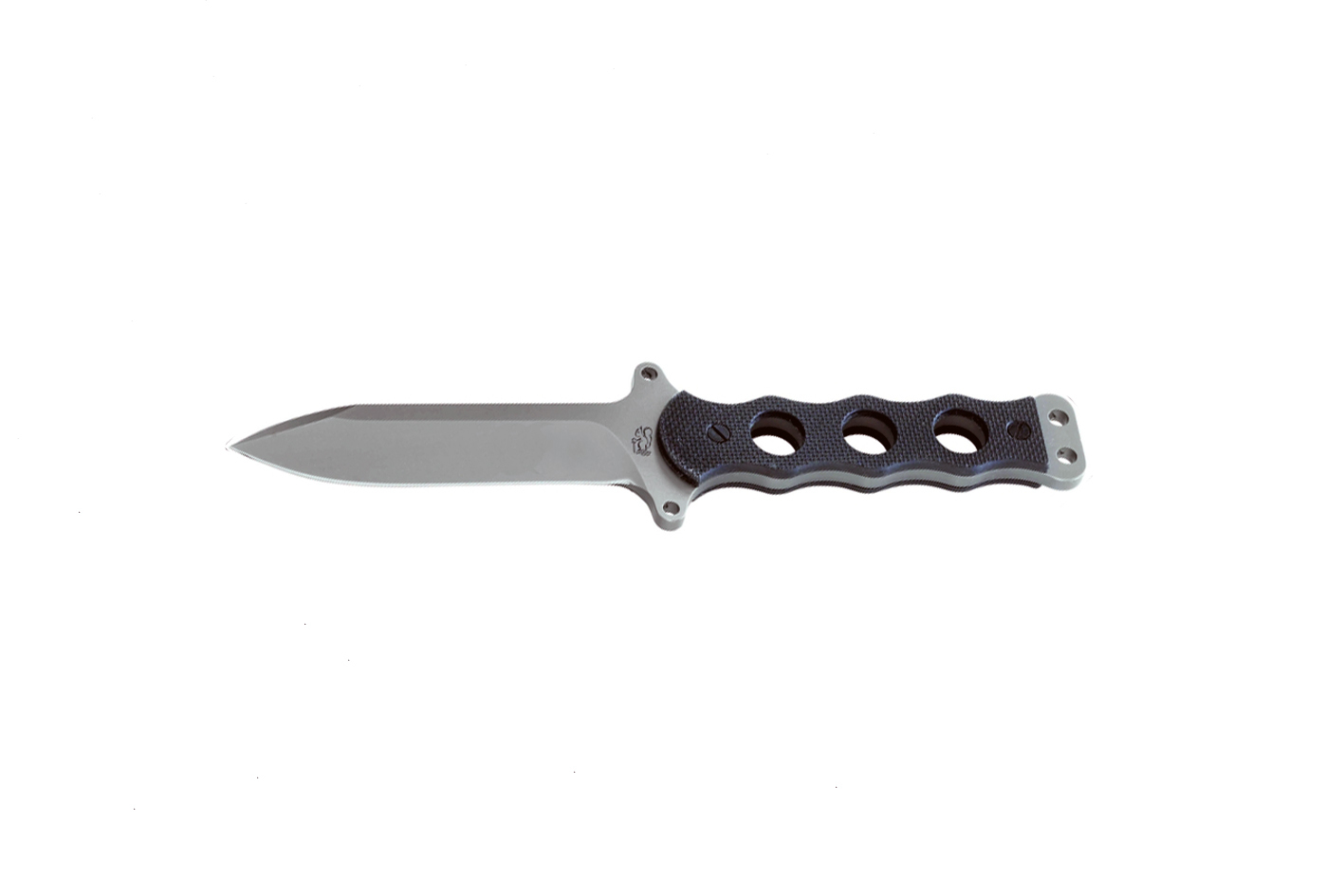
Full tang knife

A full tang extends the full length of the grip-portion of a handle, versus a partial tang which does not. A full tang may or may not be as wide as the handle itself, but will still run the full length of the handle.

There are a wide variety of full and partial tang designs. In perhaps the most common design in full tang knives, the handle is cut in the shape of the tang and handle scales are then fastened to the tang by means of pins, screws, bolts, metal tubing, epoxy, etc. The tang is left exposed along the belly, butt, and spine of the handle, extending both the full length and width of the handle.

Partial tang designs include stub, half, and three-quarter tangs, describing how far the tang extends into the handle of the tool. The most common partial tang design found in commercial knives is on folding knives, where the tang extends only as far as the pivot-point in the handle. Scalpels, utility razor blades, and a number of other knives are commonly designed with short partial tangs that are easy to fasten and unfasten from the handle so that dull or contaminated blades may be quickly exchanged for fresh ones, or so that one style of blade may be exchanged for another style while maintaining the same handle. Hollow-handled knives also incorporate a partial tang. Many inexpensive knives and swords designed for decorative purposes incorporate partial tangs and are not intended to be used for cutting applications.

A full tang knife or sword generally allows for increased force leveraged through the handle against the resistance of material being cut by the blade, an advantage when used against harder materials or when the blade begins to dull. A full tang also increases the amount of stock metal in the handle of the tool which can be beneficial in altering the balance point of the tool since the blade of a knife or sword is often quite heavy compared to the handle. Adding weight to the handle of a knife or sword to offset the weight of the blade moves the rotational balance point back toward the hand where it can be more easily manipulated to great effect, making for a nimble, agile tool. In general, a forward-balanced blade excels at chopping but sacrifices agility and ease of manipulation; a centre or rear-balanced blade excels at agility but sacrifices raw chopping power. Knives and swords intended for specific purposes will usually incorporate whichever design is most suited to how the tool will be handled for that specific purpose.

A partial tang knife or sword is generally not able to leverage as much force against the resistance of material being cut as a full tang design would allow. This limits the amount of force which a user should apply to the handle of such a weapon. Such designs may be optimal in light-weight knives or swords designed to be kept extremely sharp and used to cut less-resistant materials. Scalpels and Japanese samurai swords are perhaps the most well-known examples of such tools.

== Common tang styles found in swords and knives ==
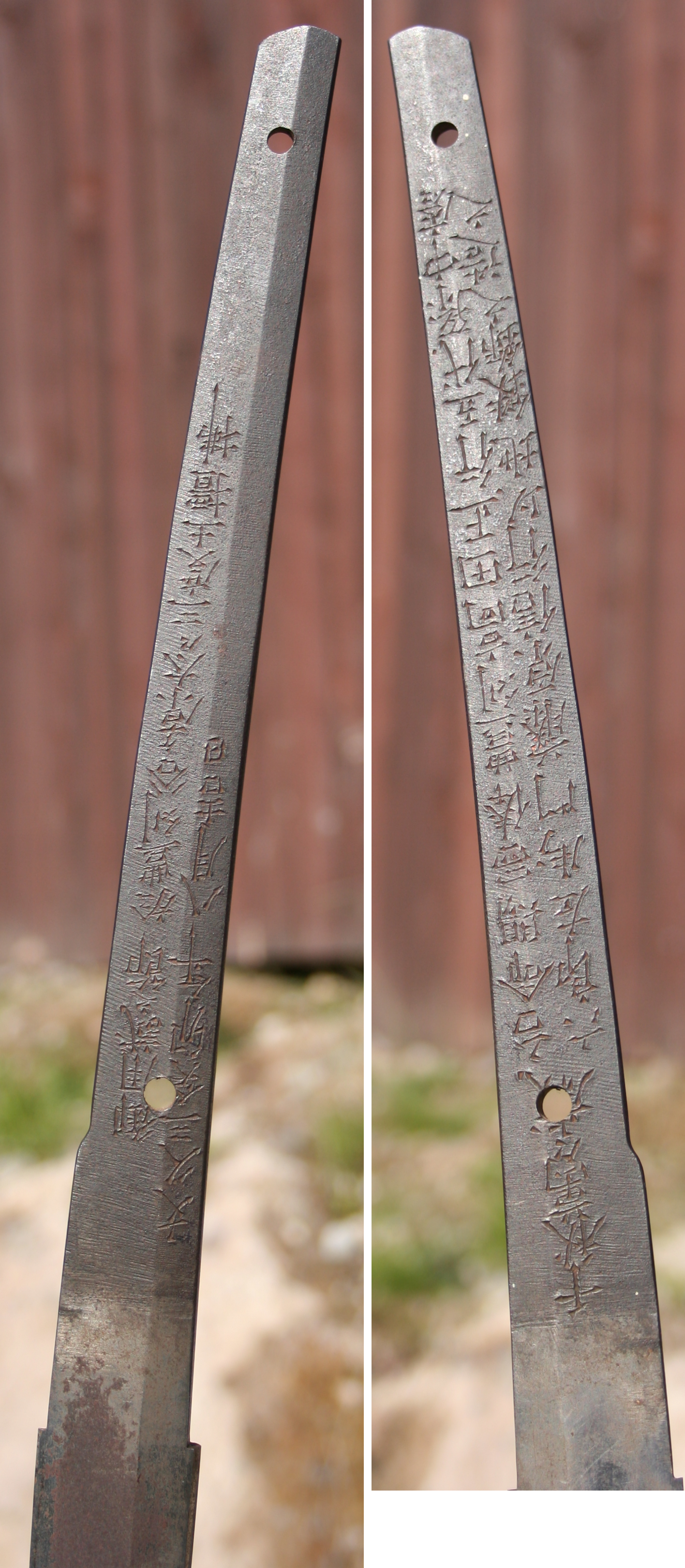
Two sides of a tang (nakago) on a Japanese katana

Most of these design styles can be used with full or partial tangs and the use of one does not exclude the use of another. For example, a sword may have a hidden, encapsulated, rat-tail tang.

A push tang is inserted or pushed into a pre-made handle and fastened in place.
An encapsulated tang has the handle material molded around the tang itself and fastened in place.
A hidden tang is fastened within the handle such that neither the tang nor the mechanism by which it is fastened is visible on the surface of the handle. A hidden tang may be accomplished in a number of ways. The simplest way to accomplish a hidden tang is with epoxy. A more sophisticated method is to construct the tang with a small protrusion (or a protrusion may be welded onto it) which fits into a notch in the handle, preventing the blade from being withdrawn from the handle. Another common method is to cut bolt-threading into the end of the tang whereby a pommel-nut screws into place. Inexpensive decorative knives and swords occasionally feature a hidden false tang consisting of a separate thin bolt welded to a stub tang on the blade, the bolt is then inserted through the handle and fastened in place by a pommel-nut.
In a stick and rat-tail tang the transition from blade to tang involves an abrupt decrease in the amount of stock metal such that the tang is narrower than the rest of the tool, more so when the transition resembles that between a rat's thick body and its thin tail. This style of tang is often used in decorative swords and blades, which are never intended for actual use and therefore do not require a strong, functional tang.
In a tapered tang the width of the tang gradually decreases in one or more dimensions along its length. Tapered tangs may feature thinning along the spine from blade to pommel, thinning from spine to belly, or even hollowing from the edges toward the midsection of the tang-stock. This is an uncommon but sophisticated design used to reduce the amount of material (and thereby the weight) in the handle of the tool without significant sacrifice of strength.
In a skeletonized tang large sections along the tang are cut away, reducing the amount of stock material to a basic framework while still providing structural support. This is another sophisticated, modern method of reducing the material weight of the tang without sacrificing significant material strength or support. Skeletonized tangs are also commonly utilized to provide storage space in the handle of the tool.
In an extended tang the tang extends beyond the grip of the handle. In knives, the extended tang may function as a hammer-pommel.
With a through tang the tang extends the full length of the handle, but does not extend the width enough to be exposed on its back, front, nor either of its sides.
In a slab tang the tang extends the full width and length of the handle so that it is exposed on its bottom, back, and front. The handle scales are fastened to either side of the tang.

== Tang stamps ==
The tang of a blade often contains so called tang stamps identifying the manufacturer of the knife and the (often encoded) year of manufacturing, sometimes also the type of metal used or serial numbers.

== See also ==
- Hafting
- Factory mark
