= Yoroi-dōshi =

Type of Japanese sword

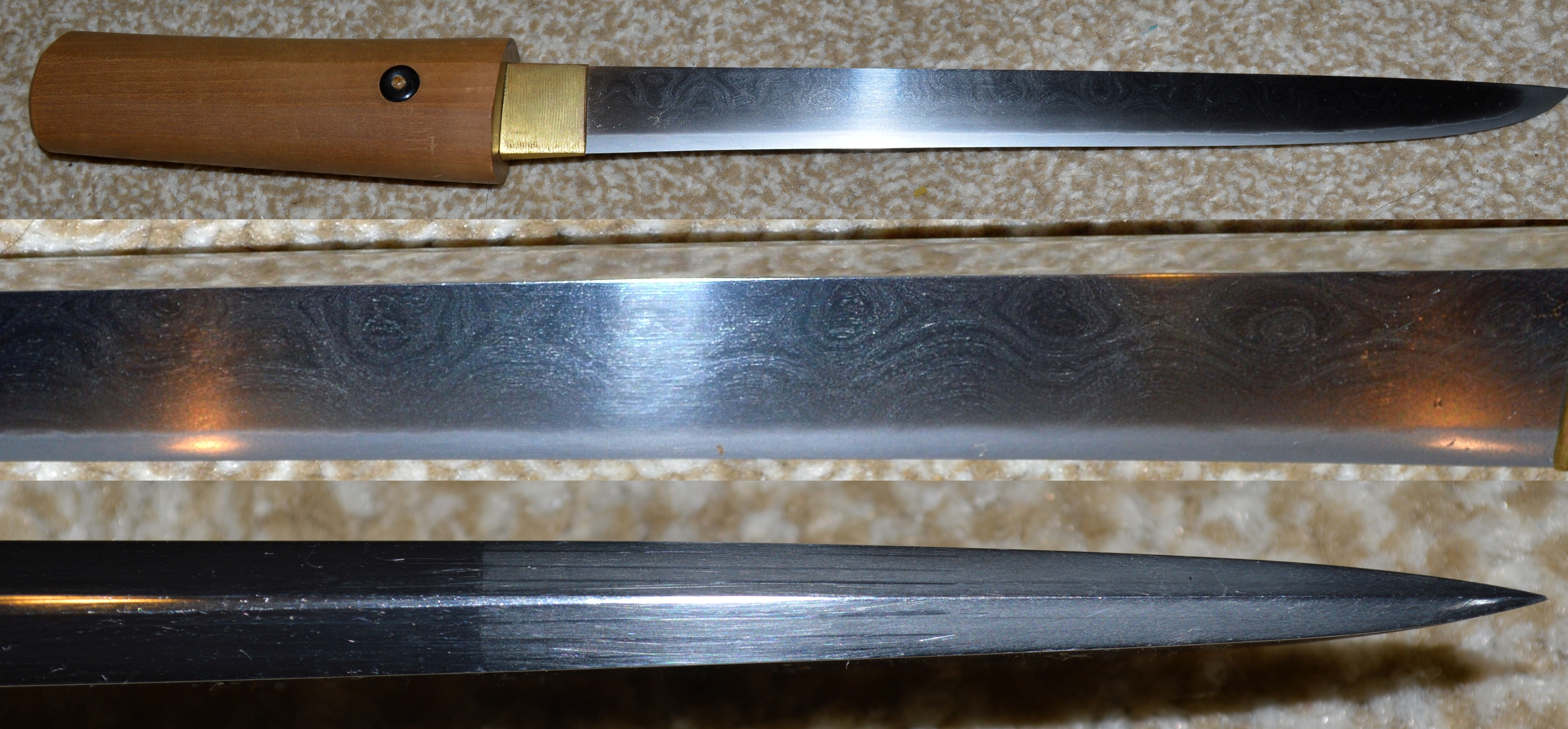
Gassan school yoroi-doshi tanto. Signed "Yoshiteru", c. 1865, 0.5 in (13 mm) motogasane, (blade thickness) at the hamachi (the notch at the beginning of the cutting edge), 10 in (250 mm) nagasa (cutting edge), "ayasugi hada” which looks like a series of undulating rolling waves.

The yoroi-dōshi (鎧通し), "armor piercer" or "mail piercer", is one of the traditionally made Japanese swords (nihontō) that were worn by the samurai class as a weapon in feudal Japan.

== Description ==
The yoroi-dōshi is an extra thick tantō, a short sword, which appeared in the Sengoku period (late Muromachi) of the 14th and 15th centuries. The yoroi-dōshi was made for piercing armour and for stabbing while grappling in close quarters. The blade was generally from 20 to 30 cm (7.9 to 11.8 in) in length, but some examples could be shorter than 15 cm (5.9 in), with a "tapering mihaba, iori-mune, thick kasane at the top, and thin kasane at the bottom and occasionally moroha-zukuri construction". The motogasane (blade thickness) at the munemachi (the notch at the beginning of the back edge of the blade) can be up to 1 cm (0.39 in) thick, which is characteristic of the yoroi-dōshi. The extra thickness at the spine of the blade distinguishes the yoroi-dōshi from a standard tantō blade.

Yoroi-dōshi were worn inside the belt on the back or on the right side with the hilt toward the front and the edge upward. Due to being worn on the right, the blade would have been drawn using the left hand, giving rise to the alternate name of metezashi (馬手差), or "horse-hand (i.e. rein-hand, i.e. left-hand) blade".

== Gallery ==
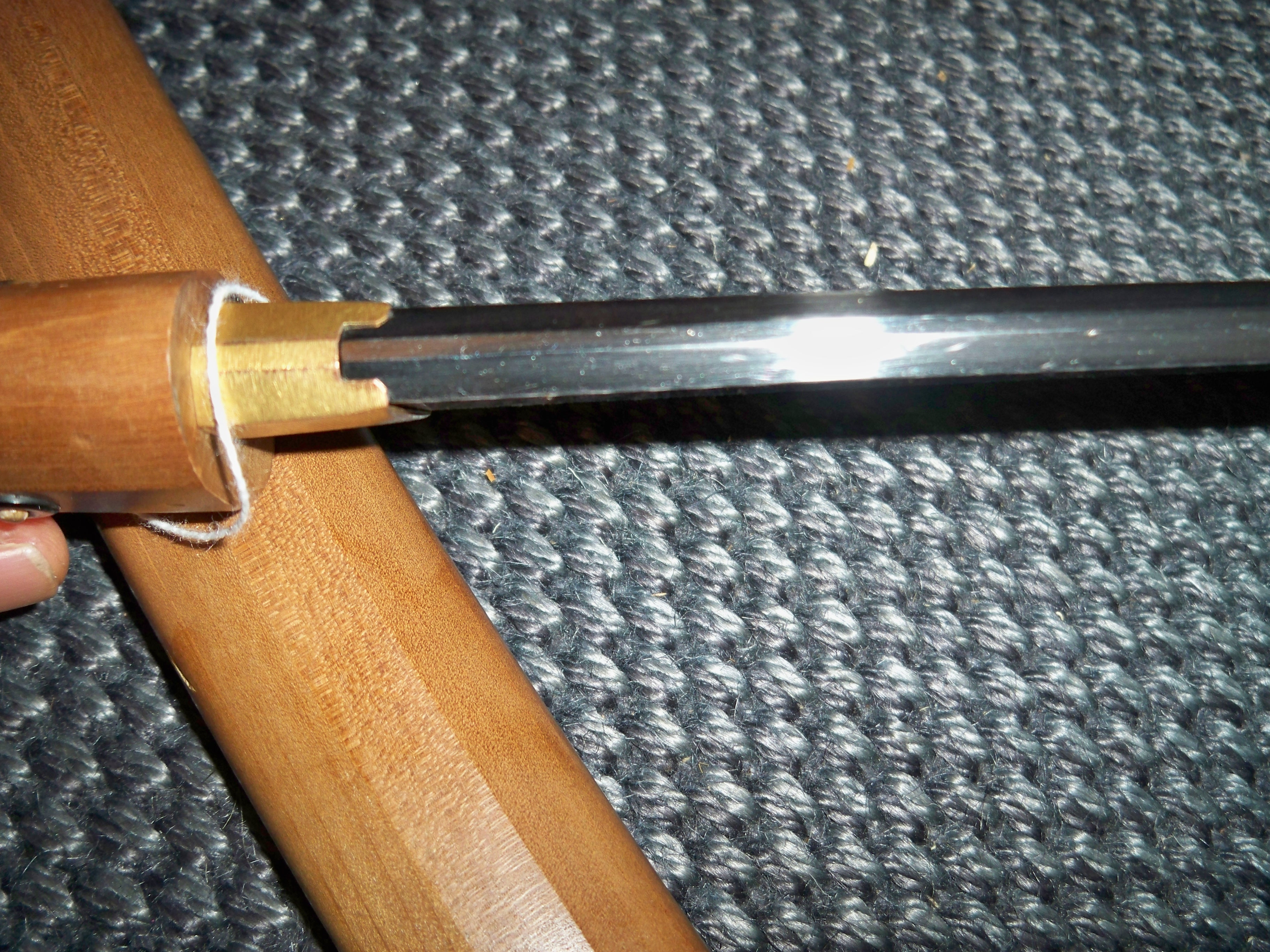
A yoroi-dōshi, showing its thick spine

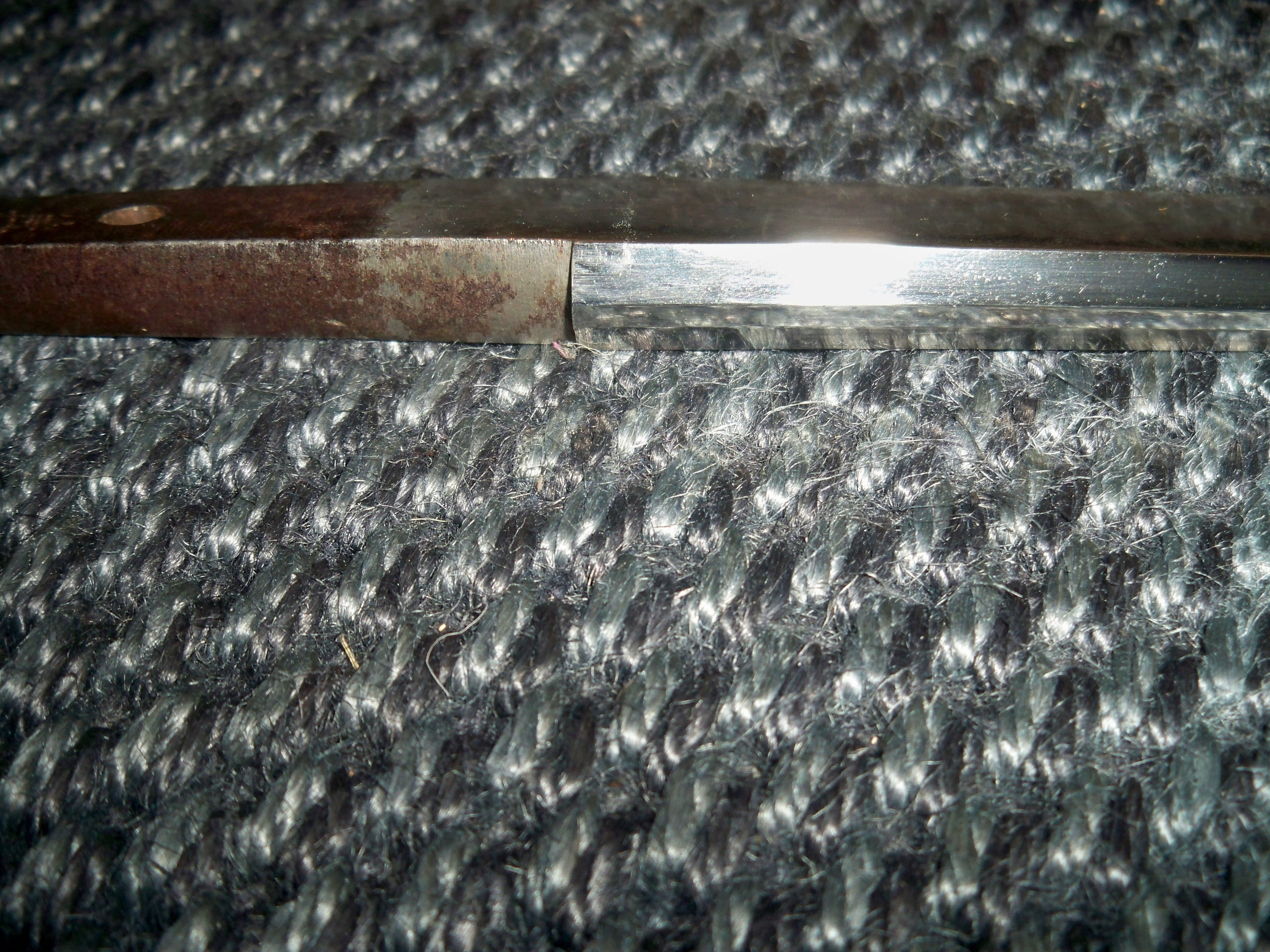
Antique Japanese yoroi-dōshi showing the extra thick blade

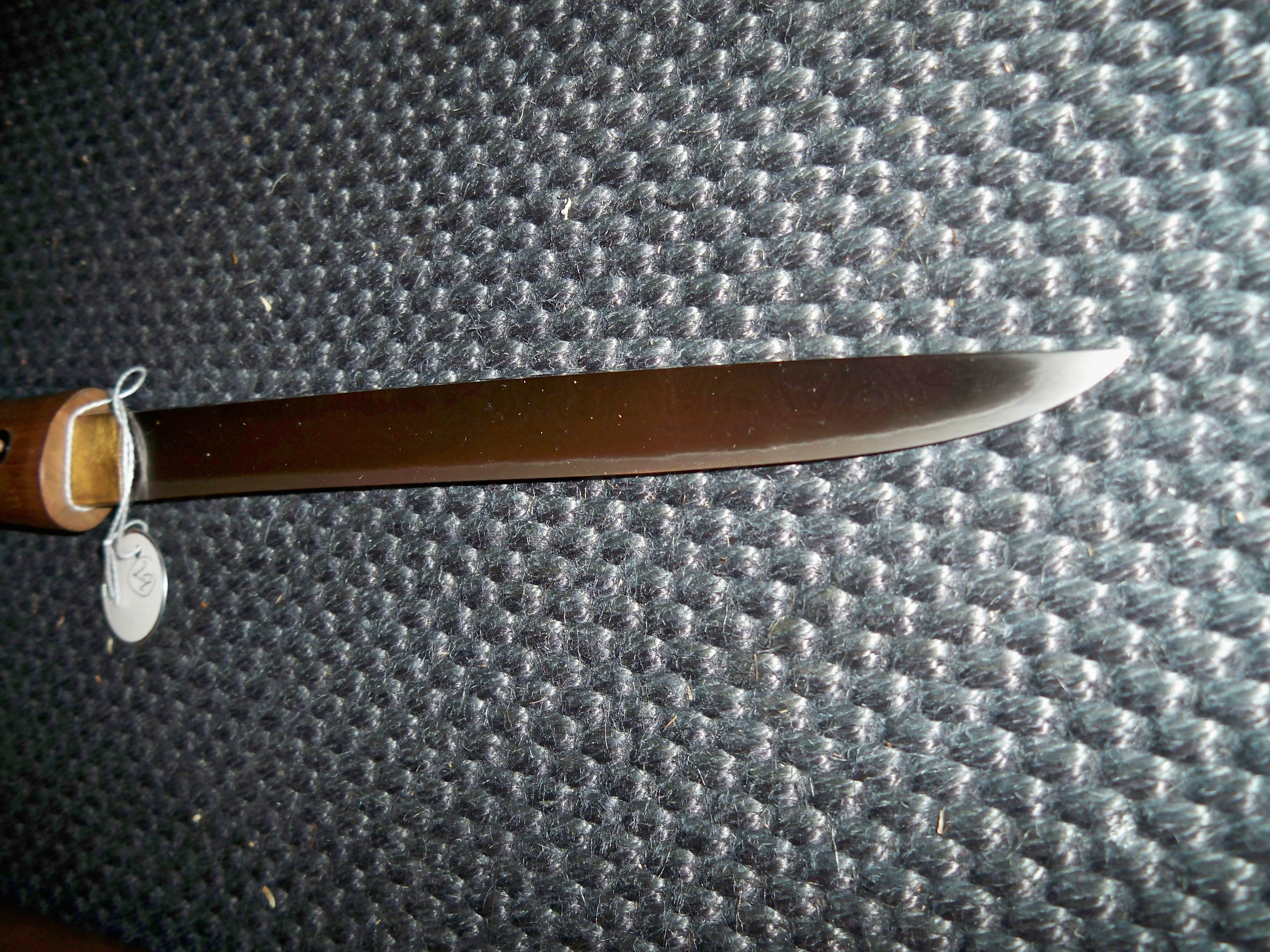
Antique Japanese yoroi-dōshi blade

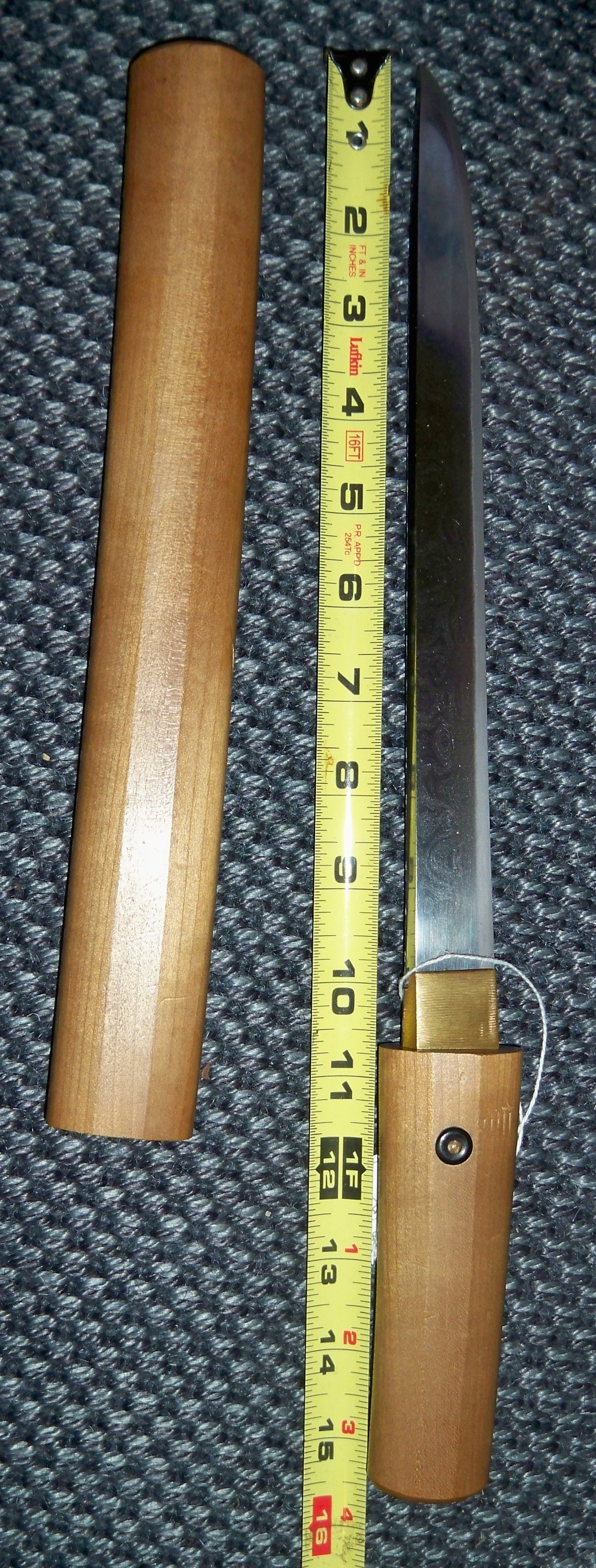
A yoroi-dōshi

== See also ==
- Otoya Yamaguchi – assassin of Inejirō Asanuma
- Wakizashi – Japanese dagger, sometimes the shorter sword in a daishō
- Kabutowari - Japanese side-arm used for getting through armor
