= Masamune =

Japanese swordsmith (c.1264–1343)

- 正宗
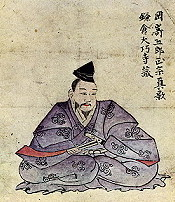
- Masamune Portrait

Personal details
- Born: c. 1264 Japan
- Died: 1343 (aged 79)
- Children: 1, Hikoshiro Sadamune
- Occupation: Swordsmith

Gorō Nyūdō Masamune (五郎入道正宗; Japanese pronunciation: [ma.saꜜ.mɯ.ne], c. 1264–1343) was a medieval Japanese blacksmith widely acclaimed as Japan's greatest swordsmith. He created swords and daggers, known in Japanese as tachi and tantō, in the Sōshū school. However, many of his forged tachi were made into katana by cutting the tang (nakago) in later times (suriage). For this reason, his only existing works are katana, tantō, and wakizashi. No exact dates are known for Masamune's life. It is generally agreed that he made most of his swords between 1288 and 1328. Some stories list his family name as Okazaki (岡崎; [o.kaꜜ.(d)za.kʲi]), but some experts believe this is a fabrication to enhance the standing of the Tokugawa family.

Masamune is believed to have worked in Sagami Province during the last part of the Kamakura period (1288–1328), and it is thought that he was trained by swordsmiths from Bizen and Yamashiro provinces, such as Saburo Kunimune, Awataguchi Kunitsuna and Shintōgo Kunimitsu. He was the father of Hikoshiro Sadamune, also a famous Sōshū master.

An award for swordsmiths called the Masamune Prize is awarded at the Japanese Sword Making Competition. Although not awarded every year, it is presented to a swordsmith who has created an exceptional work.

== Style ==
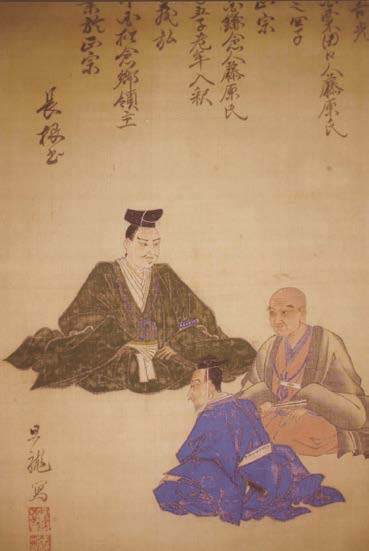
The Three Great Masters of Soshu-den. Go Yoshihiro (top) Masamune (centre) Awataguchi Yoshimitsu (bottom)

The swords of Masamune possess a reputation for superior beauty and quality, remarkable in a period where the steel necessary for swords was often impure. He is considered to have brought to perfection the art of "nie" (錵; martensitic crystals embedded in pearlite matrix, thought to resemble stars in the night sky).

Masamune studied under Shintōgo Kunimitsu and made blades in suguha (straight temper line), but he made notare hamon, where the finish on the leading edge of blade slowly undulates where it was quenched. There are also some blades with ko-midare (small irregularities), a style which appears to have been copied from the Old Bizen and Hōki Province styles. His works are well-characterized by striking chikei (dark lines following the grain pattern in the steel above the hamon), kinsuji (lightning shaped lines of nie), and nie (crystals of martensite embedded in a pearlite matrix).

Swords created by Masamune often are referred to with the smith's name (as with other pieces of artwork) and often with a name for the individual sword as well. The "Honjo Masamune", a symbol of the Tokugawa shogunate and passed down from shōgun to shōgun, is perhaps the best known Masamune sword.

Signed works of Masamune are rare. The examples "Fudo Masamune", "Kyōgoku Masamune", and "Daikoku Masamune" are accepted as his genuine works. Judging from his style, he was active from the late Kamakura period to the Nanboku-chō period.

== Swords ==
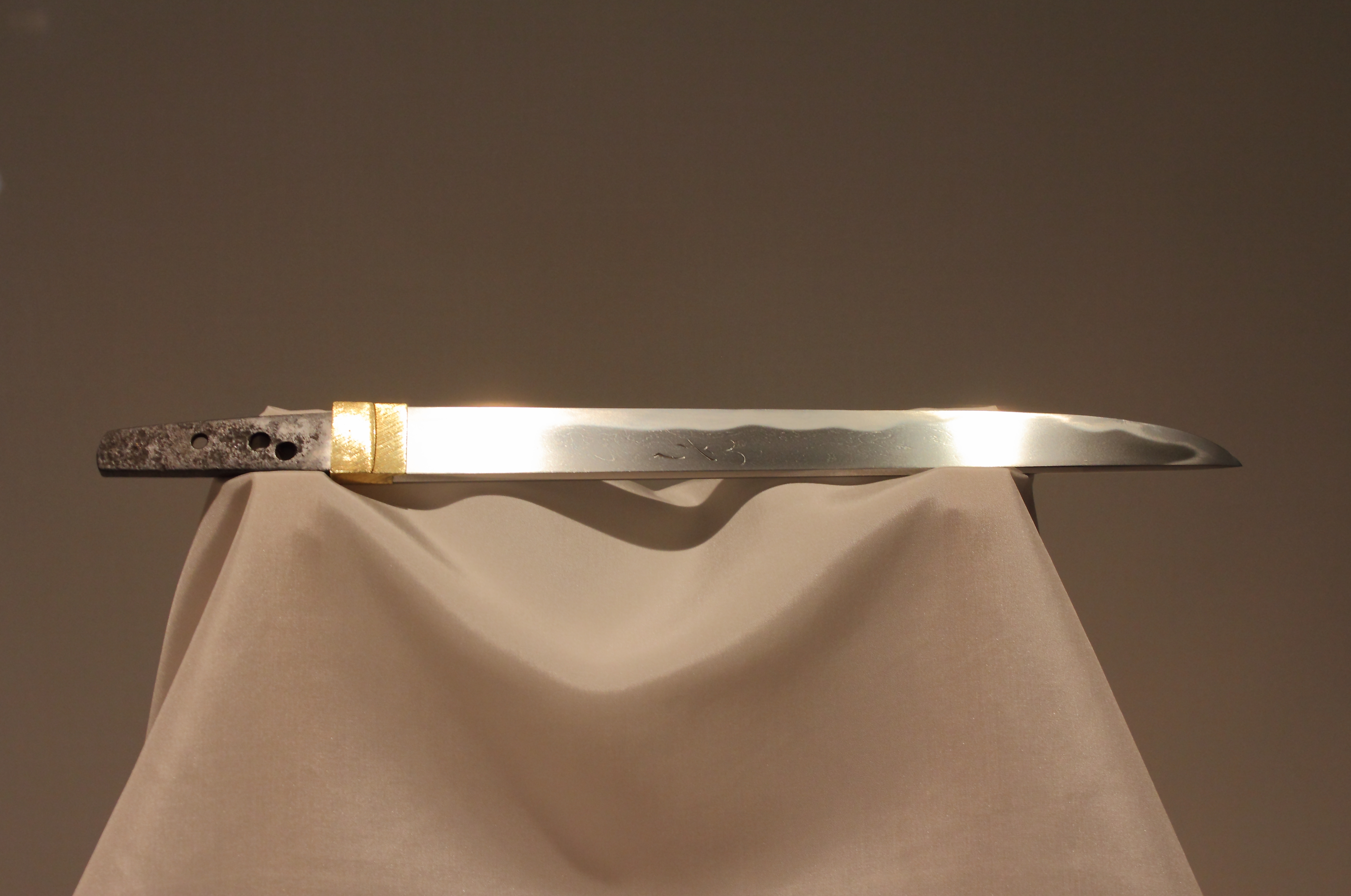
Tantō Masamune, Important Art Object

Many of his forged tachi were later made into katana by cutting the tang (nakago). For this reason, his only existing works are katana, tantō, and wakizashi. Thus, cutting the tang of an old tachi and making it into a katana according to the popularity of the katana was called suriage, which was common in Japanese history.

=== Kyōhō Meibutsuchō ===
The Kyōhō Meibutsuchō is a catalogue of famous Japanese swords commissioned by Tokugawa Yoshimune, the eighth shogun of the Tokugawa shogunate. It was compiled by the Hon'ami clan, renowned sword appraisers and polishers, and documents the characteristics and provenance of each blade. The catalogue also includes detailed drawings of each sword’s shape and hamon (temper pattern), faithfully reproduced on paper. Although many of the most celebrated swords in Japanese history are included, not all famous blades appear in the listing. The original manuscript has not survived, but several historical copies exist. Among these are four versions that begin with the tantō Atsushi Tōshirō, and three that begin with the tantō Hirano Tōshirō. Swords listed in the Kyōhō Meibutsuchō are traditionally referred to as meibutsu, meaning "celebrated item", and are often known by names that include this prefix, such as the Meibutsu Hyūga Masamune. All five of the Tenka-Goken (Five Great Swords under Heaven), which have historically often been regarded as the finest Japanese swords, are listed in the Kyōhō Meibutsuchō and are referred to with the prefix meibutsu.

The Kyōhō Meibutsuchō lists 248 famous swords. Among them, 80 had already been lost during the Siege of Osaka and are included only as historical records. Masamune is represented by 59 swords, 18 of which had already been lost at the time the catalog was compiled. This accounts for an overwhelming one quarter of the entire list, making Masamune the most prominently featured swordsmith in the catalog. Awataguchi Yoshimitsu (Tōshirō Yoshimitsu) is represented by 34 swords, 18 of which had been lost. Sadamune is represented by 22 swords, 3 of which had been lost, and Gō Yoshihiro is represented by 22 swords, 11 of which had been lost. These four smiths are recorded in far greater numbers than others. As a result, Masamune, Yoshimitsu, and Yoshihiro came to be regarded as the Tenka-Sansaku (天下三作), meaning "Three Great Smiths under Heaven." Later, from the late Edo period to the Taishō era, Hon'ami Kōjo and several sword scholars compiled supplemental volumes to the original Kyōhō Meibutsuchō. These supplements added 2 swords attributed to Masamune, 5 to Yoshimitsu, 2 to Sadamune, and 1 to Yoshihiro.

=== Designation of cultural properties by the Japanese government ===
As of August 2024, the Agency for Cultural Affairs of Japan has designated 122 Japanese swords as National Treasures and 790 as Important Cultural Properties. Among those attributed to Masamune, 9 are National Treasures and 10 are Important Cultural Properties. These include 4 katana and 5 tantō among the former, and 6 katana, 3 tantō, and 1 wakizashi among the latter.

The Honjō Masamune was designated a National Treasure under the former system established by a 1929 law, but its whereabouts became unknown in 1946. Since the Law for the Protection of Cultural Properties, which forms the basis for the current designations of National Treasures and Important Cultural Properties, was enacted in 1950, the Honjō Masamune is not designated under the current system and is not included in the official count of National Treasures. Under the current system, National Treasures designated under the former system are regarded as equivalent to Important Cultural Properties. Accordingly, they are not included in official statistics, but may still be considered part of that category.

Several of Masamune's swords have been designated as Important Art Objects (Jūyō Bijutsuhin). This designation was established under a 1933 law enacted to prevent the export of culturally significant artworks from Japan. At the time, the classification of Important Cultural Property did not yet exist, so these objects were effectively regarded as "quasi-National Treasures." With the enactment of the Law for the Protection of Cultural Properties in 1950, the 1933 law was repealed, and its certification system was reviewed. Items deemed of lower value had their designation revoked, while those considered of higher value were elevated to the newly created Important Cultural Property status. Others retained their designation as Important Art Objects. The 1929 law, under which National Treasures had been designated, was also repealed, and all former National Treasures under that system were reclassified as Important Cultural Properties. As a result, under the current system, National Treasures from the prewar era are regarded as equivalent in value to Important Cultural Properties, and only the most outstanding among them were subsequently re-designated as National Treasures. Although no new Important Art Objects have been designated since the 1933 law was repealed, the classification remains valid and is still regarded as a rank below Important Cultural Property.

Among the nine swords by Masamune that have been designated as National Treasures, the only one not listed in the Kyōhō Meibutsuchō and therefore not considered a Meibutsu is the Tsugaru Masamune.

=== National Treasure under the former system ===
==== Honjō Masamune (katana, meibutsu) ====
The Honjō Masamune represented the Tokugawa shogunate during most of the Edo period and was passed down from one shōgun to another. It is one of the best known of the swords created by Masamune and is believed to be among the finest Japanese swords ever made. It was made a Japanese National Treasure (Kokuhō) in 1939. Under the current system established by the 1950 Law for the Protection of Cultural Properties, items that had been designated as National Treasures under the prewar system prior to 1950 are regarded as equivalent to Important Cultural Properties.

The name Honjō probably came about by the sword's connection to General Honjō Shigenaga (1540–1614) who gained the sword after a battle in 1561. Shigenaga was attacked by Umanosuke who already possessed a number of trophy heads. Umanosuke struck Shigenaga with the Honjō Masamune which split his helmet, but he survived and took the sword as a prize. The blade had a number of chips from the great battle but was still usable. It was kept by Shigenaga until he was sent to Fushimi Castle around 1592.

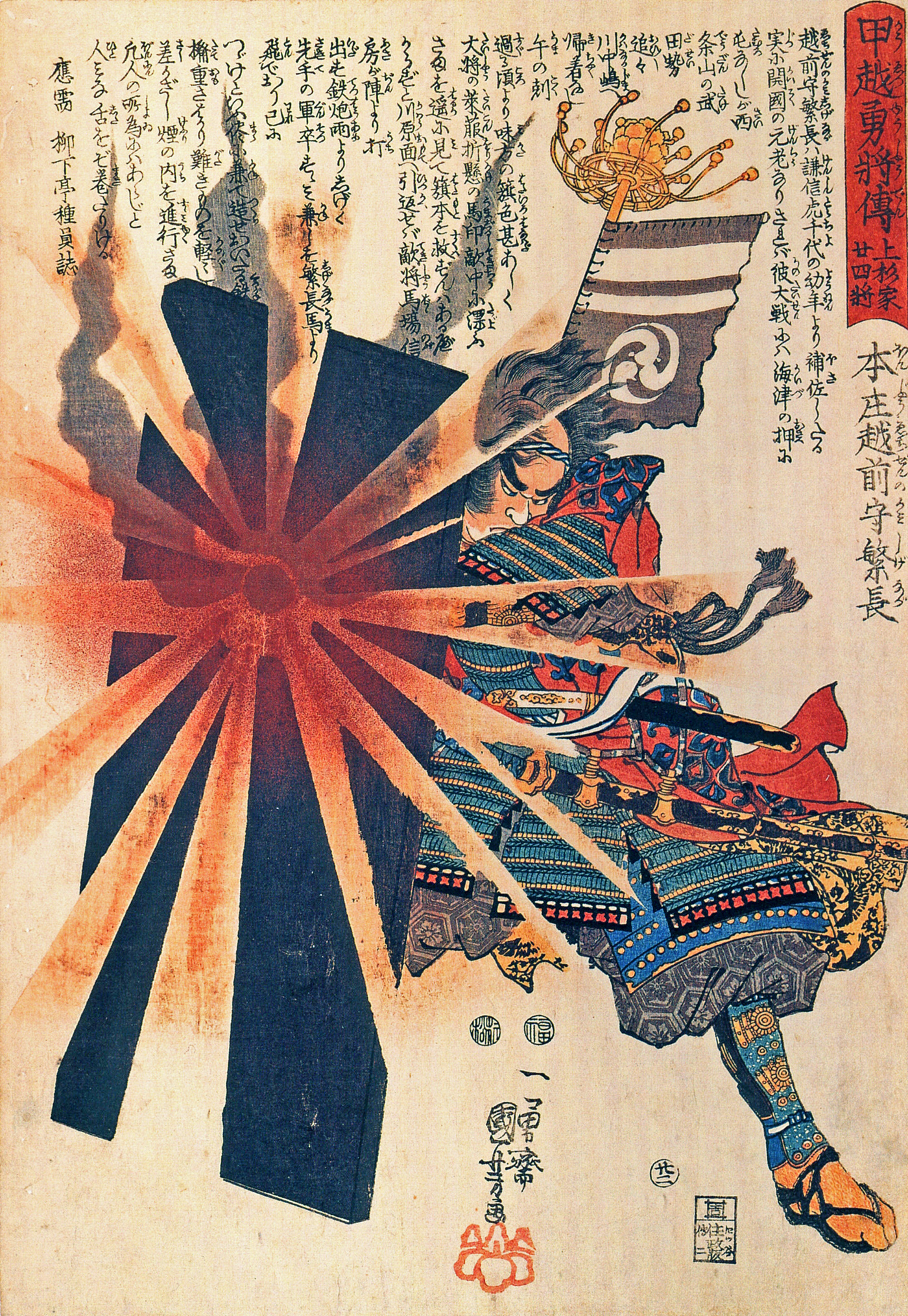
Honjo Shigenaga

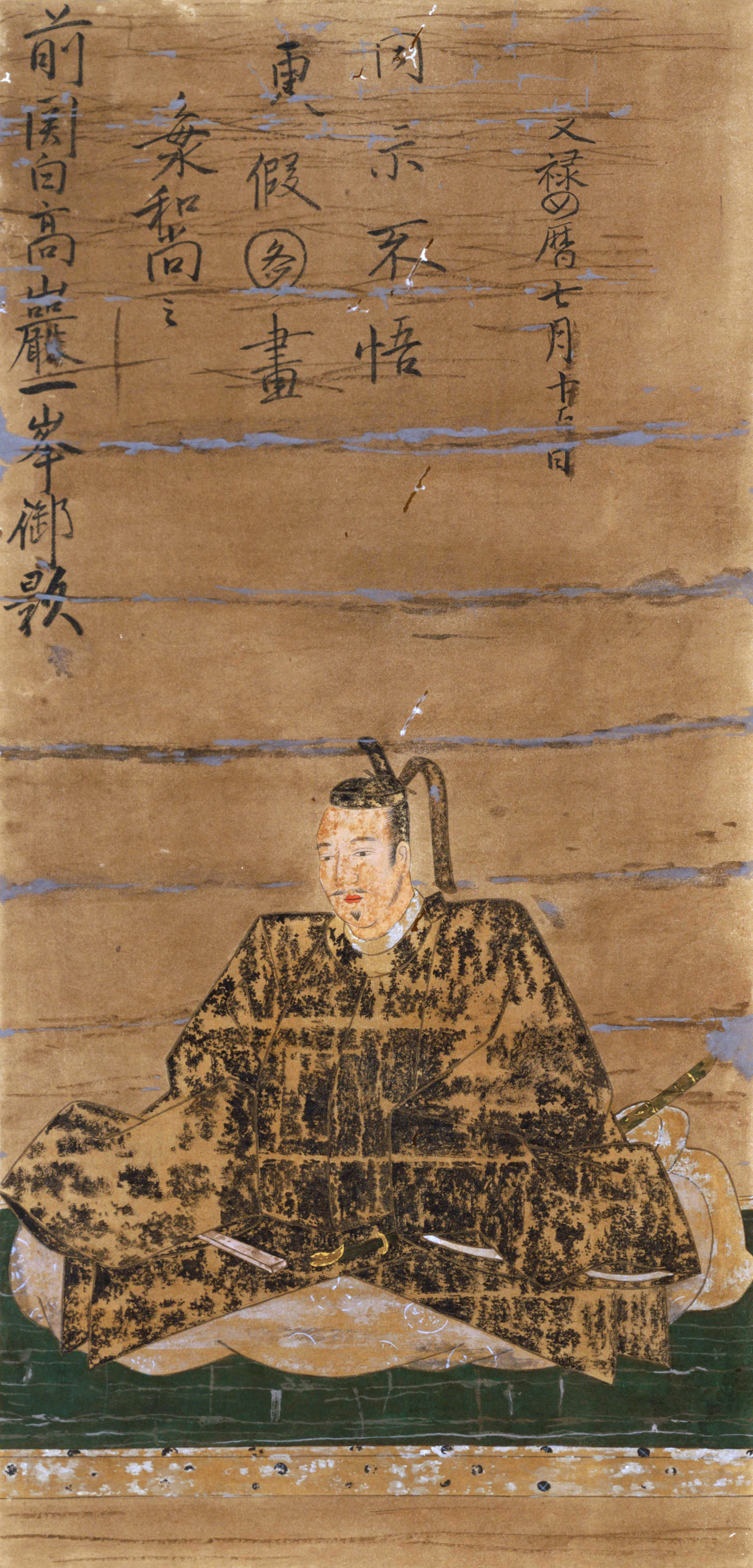
Toyotomi-Hidetsugu

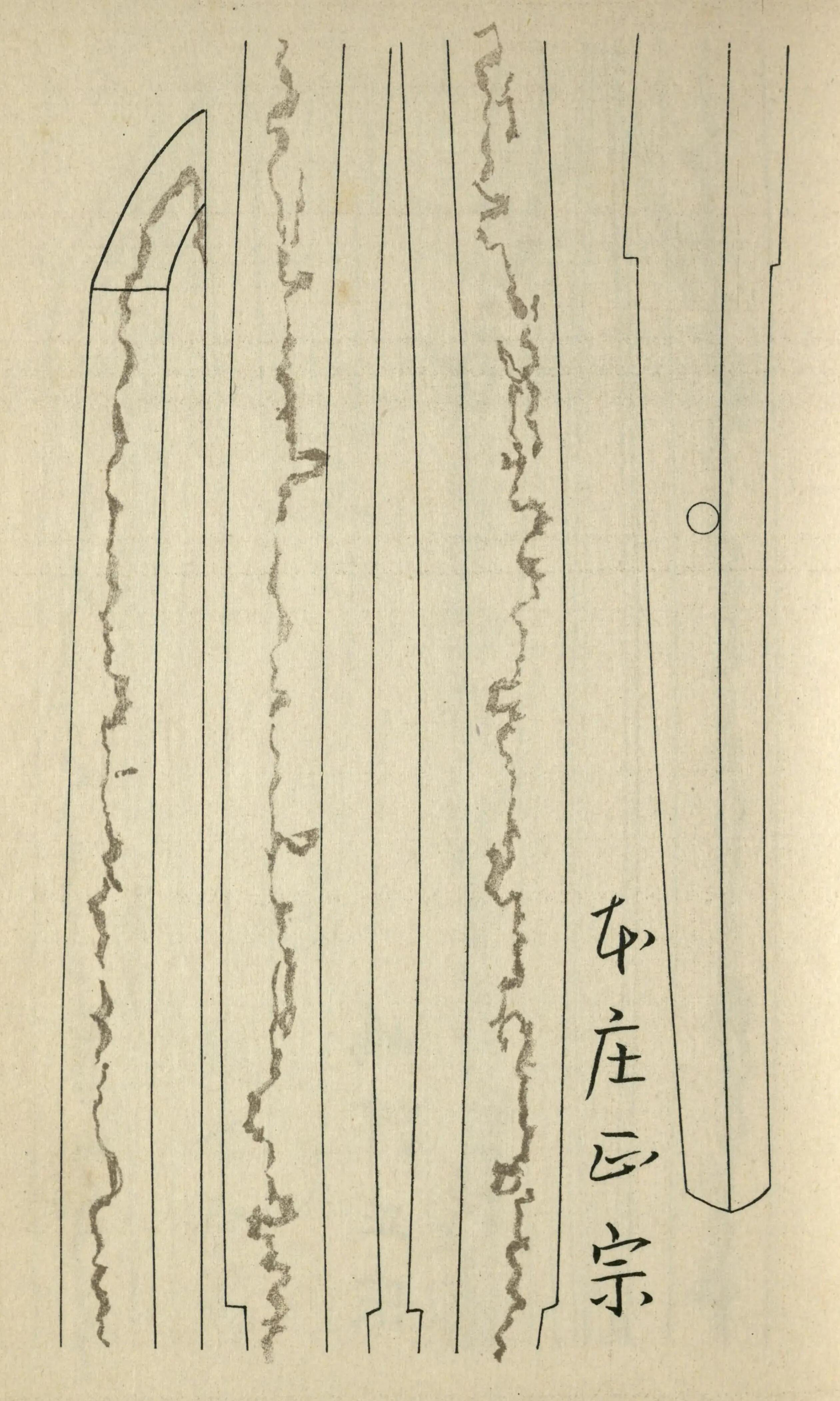
A drawing of the Honjo Masamune drawn by 17 century swordsmith Tsuguhira

Shigenaga was later forced to sell the sword to Toyotomi Hidetsugu, Toyotomi Hideyoshi's nephew and retainer. It was bought for 13 Mai, 13 ōban, which was 13 large gold coins. The blade was later valued in the Kyoho Meibutsu Cho at 1,000 Mai. It then went to Toyotomi Hideyoshi, Shimazu Yoshihiro, again to Hideyoshi, Tokugawa Ieyasu, Tokugawa Yorinobu, and finally Tokugawa Ietsuna. It remained in the Kishū Tokugawa family, and this ownership continued after the end of the Tokugawa Shogunate (1868). The last known owner was Tokugawa Iemasa at the end of World War II.

Under the United States occupation at the end of World War II, all production of nihontō with edges was banned except under police or government permit. The Americans required that all swords be surrendered to the Foreign Liquidation Commission. Tokugawa Iemasa turned in the Honjō Masamune and 13 other "prized heirloom" swords to a police station at Mejiro in December 1945.

In January 1946, the Mejiro police gave the swords to a man identified as "Sgt. Coldy Bimore" (possibly a garbled phonetic spelling of the man's name) of the Foreign Liquidations Commission of AFWESPAC (Army Forces, Western Pacific). Although the NCO to whom it was delivered is identified, to date its fate and current location still remains unknown. The Honjō Masamune is the most important of the missing Japanese swords. Only vague theories exist as to the location of the sword.

=== National Treasures ===
==== Kanze Masamune (katana, meibutsu) ====
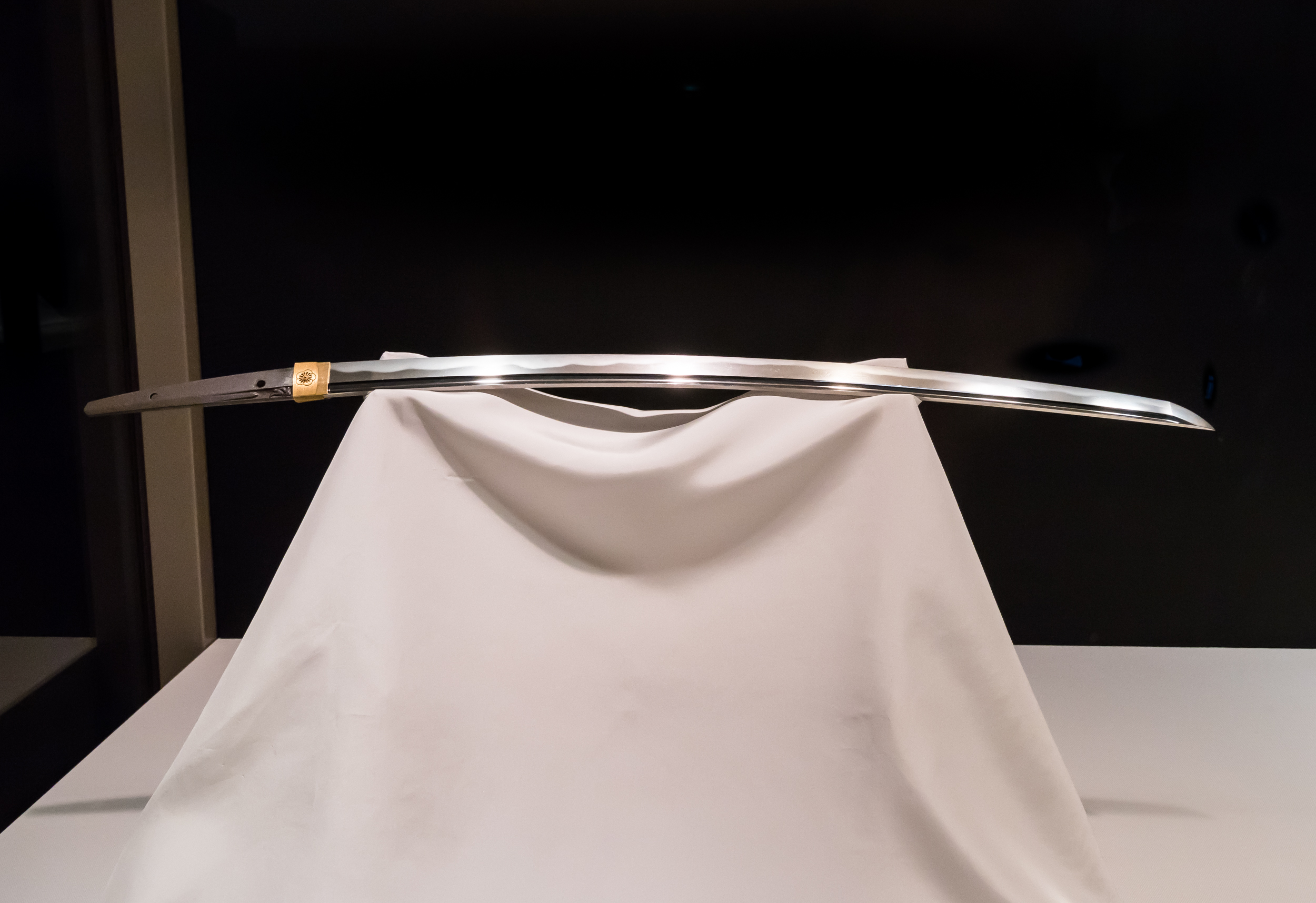
The katana nicknamed Kanze Masamune in the Tokyo National Museum. National Treasure.

The name "Kanze Masamune" originates from the fact that the katana was handed down through the Kanze clan, the hereditary heads of the Noh theatre tradition. The reason why the Kanze clan came to possess the katana is unknown. However, since they are descendants of Kan'ami and Zeami, who established Noh under the patronage of Ashikaga Yoshimitsu, it is possible that the katana was bestowed upon the Kanze clan by Yoshimitsu.

In the late 16th century, the seventh head of the Kanze clan, Kanze Sōsetsu, approached Tokugawa Ieyasu, a powerful daimyo at the time, and presented the katana to him. The katana was later given to the Honda clan as part of the bridal trousseau of Senhime, daughter of Tokugawa Hidetada, the second shogun of the Tokugawa shogunate, when she married Honda Tadatoki. After Tadatoki's death, the katana was returned to the Tokugawa shogunal family.

Following the Meiji Restoration, the last shogun, Tokugawa Yoshinobu, presented the sword to Prince Arisugawa Taruhito. It later became part of the collection of the Tokyo National Museum.

==== Nakatsukasa Masamune (katana, meibutsu) ====
Nakatsukasa Masamune is a sword once owned by Honda Tadakatsu, a prominent general who served Tokugawa Ieyasu. The nickname of the katana derives from Honda's honorary court title, Nakatsukasa-taifu, and it is also known as Kuwana Masamune, named after the Kuwana Domain, where he served as the first daimyō.

Honda Tadakatsu acquired the katana through the mediation of Hon'ami Kōtoku, a renowned sword appraiser. The tang (nakago) bears an inlaid gold inscription (kinzōgan) of both the name Masamune and that of the Hon'ami clan, who certified the sword's authenticity.

In 1606, the katana was presented to Tokugawa Ieyasu, and an additional gold inlay was added to the reverse side of the tang, noting that the sword had previously belonged to Honda Tadakatsu.

The blade was subsequently inherited by Tokugawa Yorifusa, Ieyasu’s eleventh son, and later by Tokugawa Ietsuna, the fourth shōgun of the Tokugawa shogunate. In modern times, it was eventually placed in the collection of the Tokyo National Museum.

==== Tarōsaku Masamune (katana, meibutsu) ====
Tarōsaku Masamune is a katana once owned by Mizuno Masashige, a samurai who served both Oda Nobunaga and Tokugawa Ieyasu. The name of the katana derives from Mizuno’s common name, Tarōsaku. According to tradition, he used this sword during the Battle of Anegawa to cleave through the helmet (kabuto) and skull of an enemy commander.

The katana was later presented to Tokugawa Ieyasu, who subsequently bestowed it upon the Maeda clan, rulers of the Kaga Domain. Today, the katana is owned by the Maeda Ikutokukai Foundation, a public interest incorporated foundation.

==== Tsugaru Masamune (katana) ====
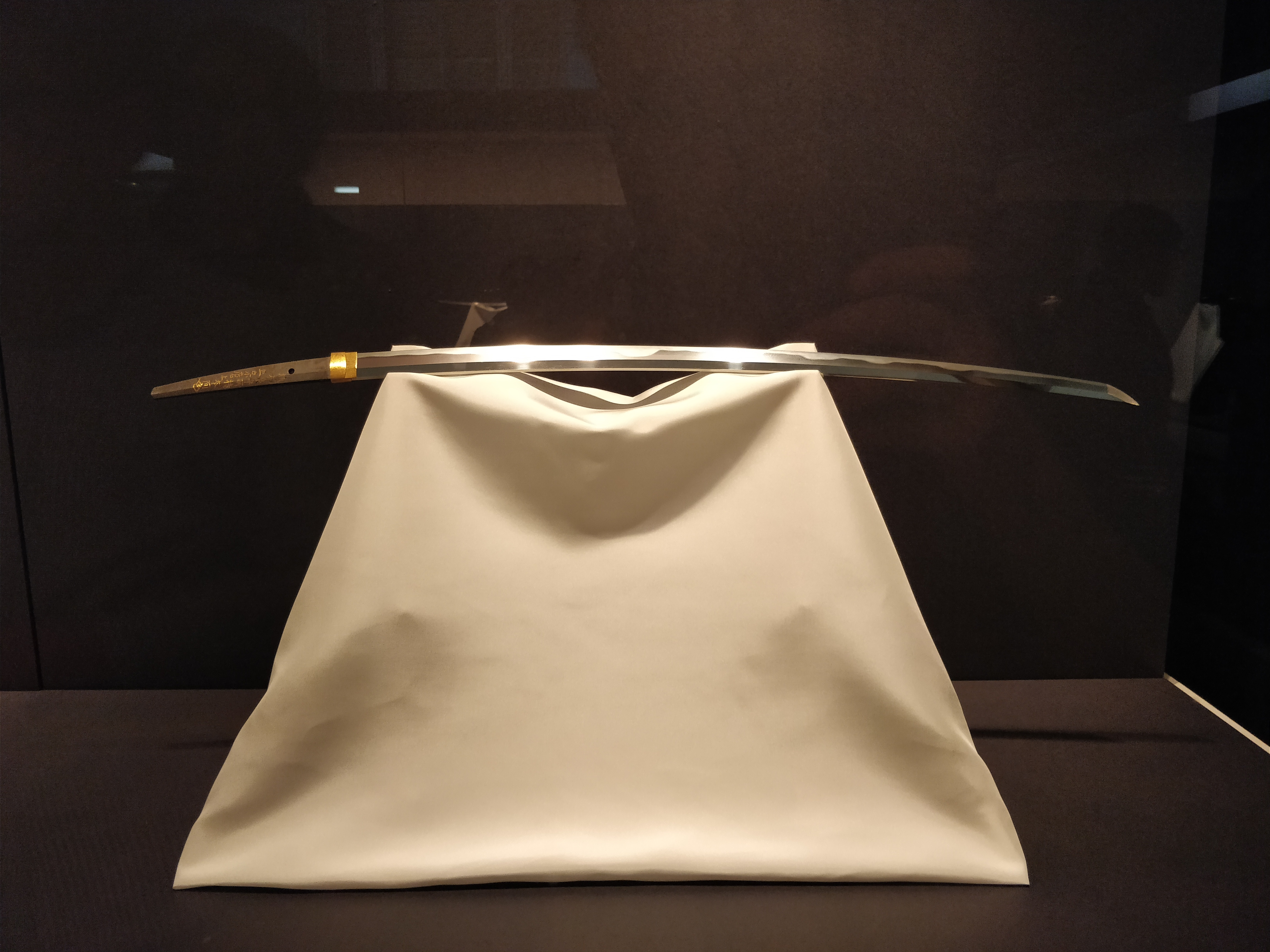
The katana nicknamed Tsugaru Masamune in the Tokyo National Museum. National Treasure.

The name "Tsugaru Masamune" originates from the fact that the katana was passed down through generations of the Tsugaru clan. Its original owner was Jō Kagemochi, who served under Takeda Shingen, and the katana was later handed down to the Tsugaru clan.

In the early Edo period, Hon'ami Kōtoku inscribed the tang with a gold-inlaid inscription (kinzōgan) indicating that the katana had once belonged to Jō Kagemochi. For this reason, the katana is also sometimes referred to as Jō Izumi no Kami Masamune, using Kagemochi's honorary court title.

It is currently housed in the Tokyo National Museum.

==== Hyuga Masamune (tantō, meibutsu) ====
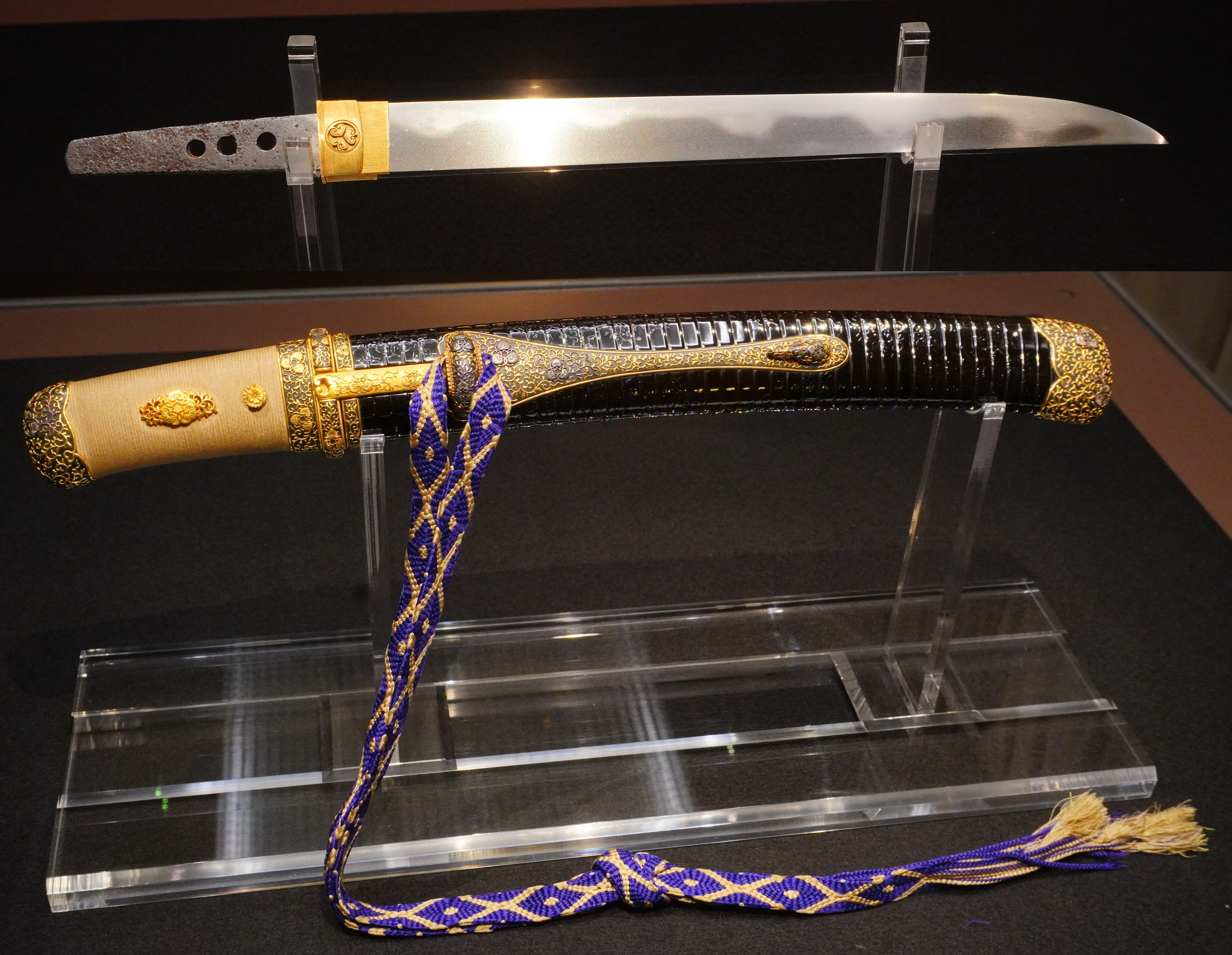
Tantō Hyuga Masamune with koshirae (mounting) and kumihimo cord, Mitsui Memorial Museum, National Treasure

Hyuga Masamune is considered one of the representative tantō forged by Masamune. It was originally owned by several generals who served under Toyotomi Hideyoshi, and it changed hands among them as a gift during the Toyotomi administration. The known owners included Katada Hirozumi, Ishida Mitsunari, and Fukuhara Nagataka. At the time, the blade was referred to as Katada Masamune, after its earliest known owner.

Following the Tokugawa victory over the Toyotomi forces at the Battle of Sekigahara, Mizuno Katsunari, a general on the Tokugawa side, seized the tantō from Fukuhara Nagataka, who had been defending Ōgaki Castle. Because of its association with the castle, the blade later became known as Ōgaki Masamune. It should not be confused with another katana also called the Ōgaki Masamune, which was owned by the Toda clan, the lords of the Ōgaki Domain.

Mizuno Katsunari later transferred the blade to the Kishū Tokugawa family as collateral for a debt. In 1652, Tokugawa Yorinobu presented the tantō to his son Tokugawa Mitsusada. Mizuno held the honorary court title Hyūga no Kami (Governor of Hyūga Province), and from this title the Kishū Tokugawa family named the blade Hyuga Masamune, passing it down through successive generations under that name.

The current koshirae (mounting) of this tantō was made during the Edo period.

Approximately sixty years after the end of Tokugawa rule following the Meiji Restoration, the tantō was put up for auction and purchased by the Mitsui family for 2,678 yen.

It was designated a National Treasure of Japan in 1941, and re-designated under the new Law for the Protection of Cultural Properties in 1952. Today, it is held by the Mitsui Memorial Museum.

==== Hōchō Masamune (tantō, meibutsu) ====
The "Hōchō" Masamune refers to any one of three particular and unusual tantō attributed to Masamune. These tantō have a wide body, unlike his normal slim and elegant work, making them appear quite similar to a Japanese cooking knife. One of the three blades has a gomabashi in cutout (sukashi). It was restored around 1919 and sold for approximately 10 hiki (a certain number of mon); this was worth roughly 14¢ US at the time, meaning that the price was remarkably low.

Of these three tantō, the one once owned by Ankokuji Ekei is now in the Eisei Bunko Museum, the one formerly belonging to the Naitō clan is in a private collection, and the remaining tantō is held by the Tokugawa Art Museum. All three have been designated National Treasures.

==== Kuki Masamune (tantō, meibutsu) ====
Kuki Masamune is a tantō once owned by Kuki Moritaka. During the Battle of Sekigahara, Moritaka sided with the Tokugawa forces, while his father, Kuki Yoshitaka, supported the Toyotomi side under Ishida Mitsunari.

Moritaka presented the tantō to Tokugawa Ieyasu, and after Ieyasu's death, it was inherited by Tokugawa Yorinobu of the Kishū Tokugawa family, and later by Matsudaira Yoritsune, lord of the Saijō Domain.

It is currently housed in the Hayashibara Museum of Art.

=== Important Cultural Properties ===
==== Ishida Masamune (katana, meibutsu) ====
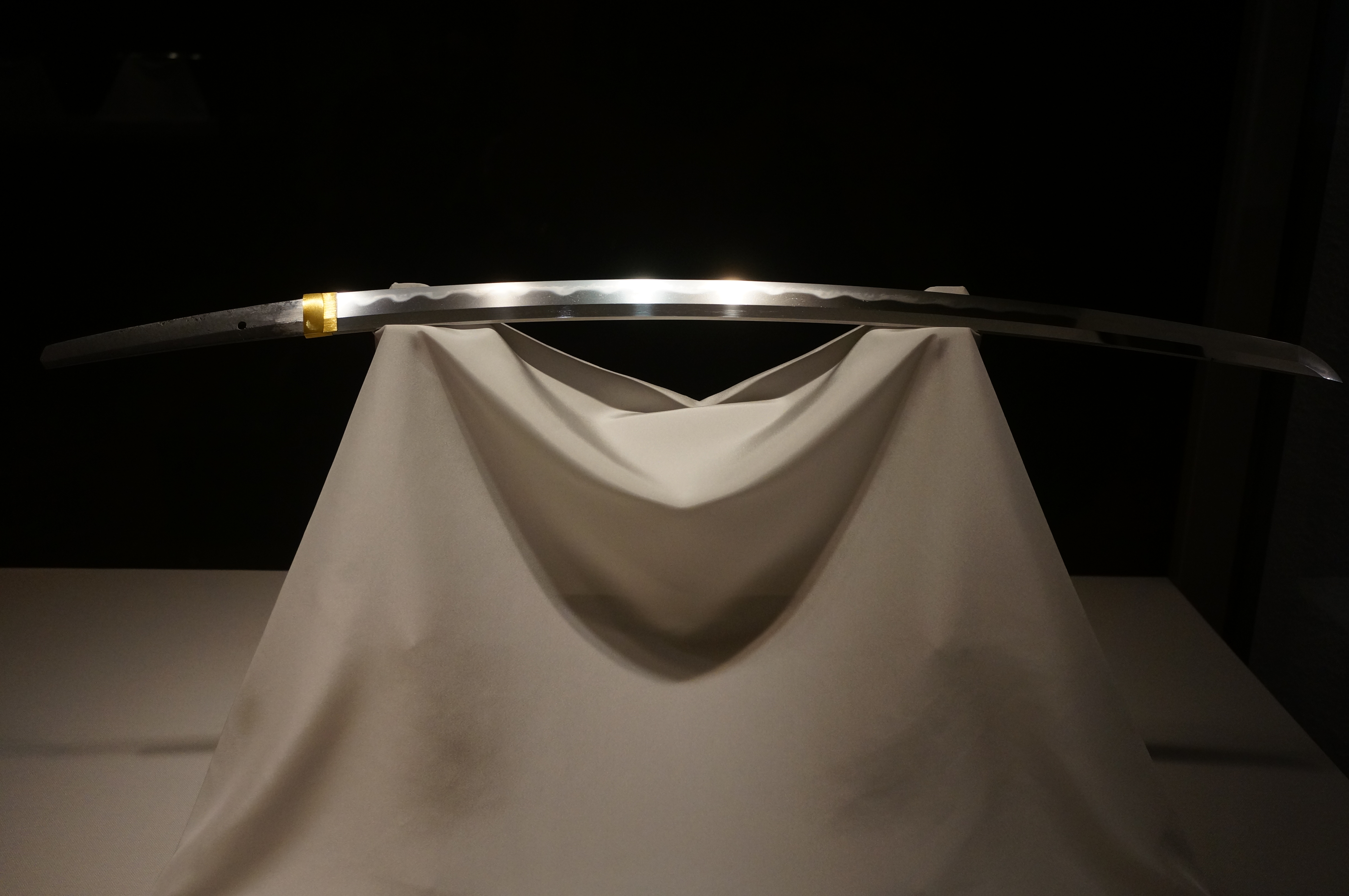
The katana nicknamed Ishida Masamune in the Tokyo National Museum was formerly owned by Ishida Mitsunari. Important Cultural Property

The name "Ishida Masamune" originates from the fact that the katana was once owned by Ishida Mitsunari. Due to damage on the blade believed to have been caused during combat, it is also known by the nickname Kirikomi Masamune. The word kirikomi refers to the act of charging into enemy lines with a sword.

After Ishida Mitsunari was dismissed from his position as one of the Go-Bugyō (Five Commissioners) and placed under house arrest, he presented this katana to Yūki Hideyasu, the second son of Tokugawa Ieyasu, who was tasked with guarding Mitsunari’s residence at the time. The Yūki clan later changed its name to Matsudaira, and in modern times, after passing through private ownership, the sword eventually came into the collection of the Tokyo National Museum.

==== Fudo Masamune (tantō, meibutsu) ====
This is one of the few blades signed by Masamune that is not in question as to the signature. It is designated as an Important Cultural Property. It was bought by Toyotomi Hidetsugu in 1601 for 500 Kan and was passed to Shōgun Ieyasu and from him to Maeda Toshiie. Maeda Toshitsune presented it again to the shōgun, possibly on his retirement. Later, the sword was handed down among the Owari Tokugawa. This blade is a tantō (dagger) approximately 25 cm (8 sun 6.5 bun) with a carving of roots on the omote (front, outer edge) side. It also has chopstick-like grooves (gomabashi 護摩箸) on the back and a dragon at the ura part of blade (kurikara 倶利伽羅). The blade features an engraving of Fudō Myō-ō, the Buddhist deity which gives this blade its name.

The Fudo Masamune is one of the few surviving blades that is known for sure to have been made and signed by the swordsmith and from the early 1600s, it was in the possession of the Owari branch of the Tokugawa clan. It was made primarily for stabbing but with a sharp edge allowing it to be useful for slashing also.

It is currently housed in the Tokyo National Museum.

=== Important Art Objects ===
==== Musashi Masamune (katana, meibutsu) ====
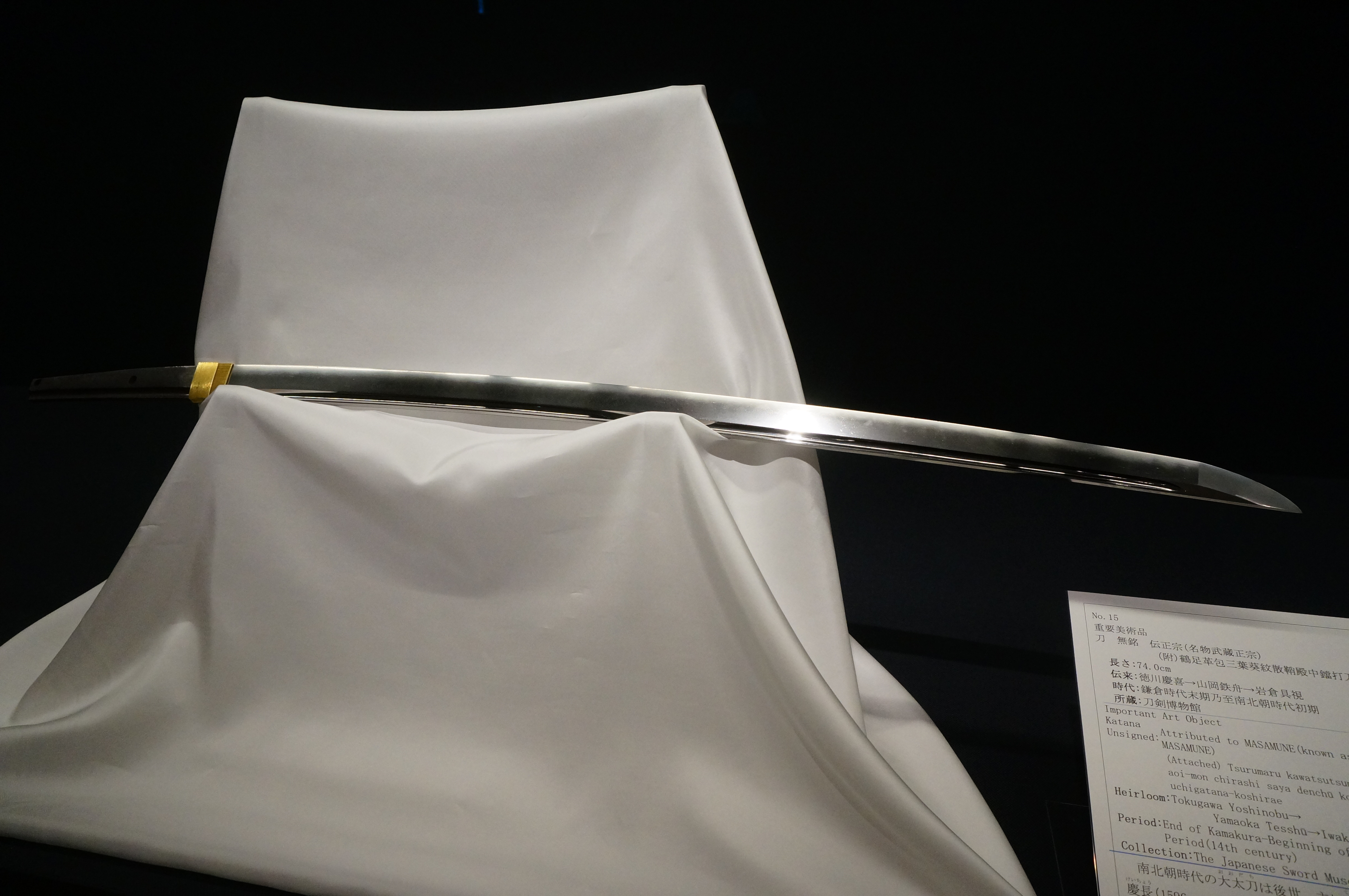
Musashi Masamune, Important Art Object, Japanese Sword Museum.

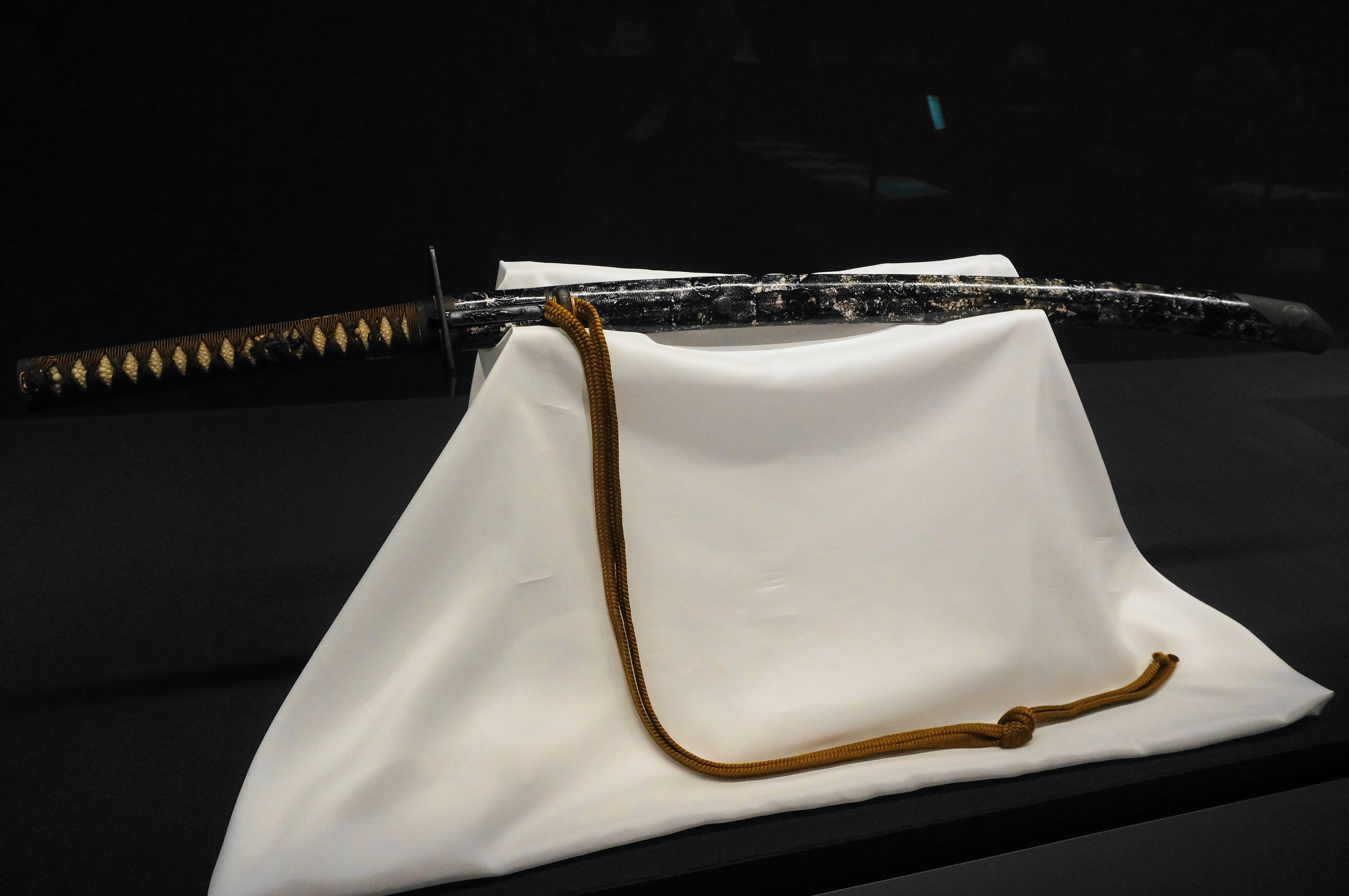
Katana koshirae for Musashi Masamune. Japanese Sword Museum

A peculiar work of Masamune, once in the possession of the Tokugawa Shogunate through the Kii Domain and gifted to the main Tokugawa family line in Edo in its prime. It is designated as an Important Art Object. Upon the end of the Tokugawa Era marked by the Bakumatsu, the Musashi Masamune was presented as a gift by Tokugawa Iesato in honor of Yamaoka Tesshū's efforts to facilitate peaceful negotiation with Katsu Kaishū to Saigō Takamori, sparing Edo from war and needless destruction; however, Yamaoka was humbled upon being given such a masterpiece, and had passed it down to statesman Iwakura Tomomi. Soon after seeing it passed from hand to hand throughout the 20th Century, the Musashi Masamune finally made its way to the Nihon Bijutsu Token Hozon Kyokai in the year 2000 by Motoo Otsuyasu. The Musashi Masamune is a tachi, measuring 74 cm (2 korai-shaku, 1 sun, 4.2 bun) and noted to have nearly all of the characteristics of Masamune's signature features; though it is debated that its o-kissaki is not that of his style, it is compared to blades made in his later career, which shows the transition of the Kamakura styles into the Nanbokucho era. It is rumored that, while the blade is named after Musashi Province, where Edo and current day Tokyo stands, its origin stems from being once in the possession of Miyamoto Musashi, who is considered Japan's most famous swordsman. The sword is classified as a meibutsu.

In 2000, this sword was acquired by the Society for the Preservation of Japanese Art Swords with the assistance of Motoo Otsuyasu.

=== Others ===
==== Kotegiri Masamune (katana, meibutsu) ====
Kotegiri means "Kote cutter". In this case kote is a contraction of yugote (弓籠手), an archer's arm-guard. This name comes from when Asakura Ujikage cut an opposing samurai's yugote in the battle of Toji in Kyôto. Oda Nobunaga gained possession of this sword and had it shortened to its present length. In 1615, it passed down to the Maeda clan who in 1882 presented it as a gift to Emperor Meiji, a known sword collector.

It is currently housed in the Tokyo National Museum.

==== Masamune in Harry S. Truman Library (katana) ====
A Masamune was given to President Harry S. Truman shortly after World War II. It is kept in the Harry S. Truman Presidential Library and Museum.

== Legends of Masamune and Muramasa ==
A legend tells of a test where Muramasa challenged his master, Masamune, to see who could make a finer sword. They both worked tirelessly, and when both swords were finished, they decided to test the results. The contest was for each to suspend the blades in a small creek with the cutting edge facing against the current. Muramasa's sword cut everything that passed its way; fish, leaves floating down the river, the very air which blew on it. Highly impressed with his pupil's work, Masamune lowered his sword into the current and waited patiently. Only leaves were cut. However, the fish swam right up to it, and the air hissed as it gently blew by the blade. After a while, Muramasa began to scoff at his master for his apparent lack of skill in the making of his sword. Smiling to himself, Masamune pulled up his sword, dried it, and sheathed it. All the while, Muramasa was heckling him for his sword's inability to cut anything. A monk, who had been watching the whole ordeal, walked over and bowed low to the two swordmasters. He then began to explain what he had seen.

The first of the swords was by all accounts a fine sword, however, it is a blood-thirsty, evil blade, as it does not discriminate as to who or what it will cut. It may just as well be cutting down butterflies as severing heads. The second was by far the finer of the two, as it does not needlessly cut that which is innocent and undeserving.

In another account of the story, both blades cut the leaves that went down on the river's current equally well, but the leaves would stick to the blade of Muramasa whereas they would slip on past Masamune's after being sliced. Alternatively, both leaves were cut, but those cut by Masamune's blade would reform as it traveled down the stream. Yet another version has leaves being sliced by Muramasa's blade while the leaves were repelled by Masamune's, and another again has leaves being sliced by Muramasa's blade and healed by Masamune's.

In yet another story Muramasa and Masamune were summoned to make swords for the shōgun or emperor, and the finished swords were held in a waterfall. The result is the same as the other stories, and Masamune's swords are deemed holy swords. In one version of the story, Muramasa is killed for creating evil swords.

While all known legends of the two ever having met are historically impossible, both smiths are widely regarded as symbols for their respective eras.

== Students ==
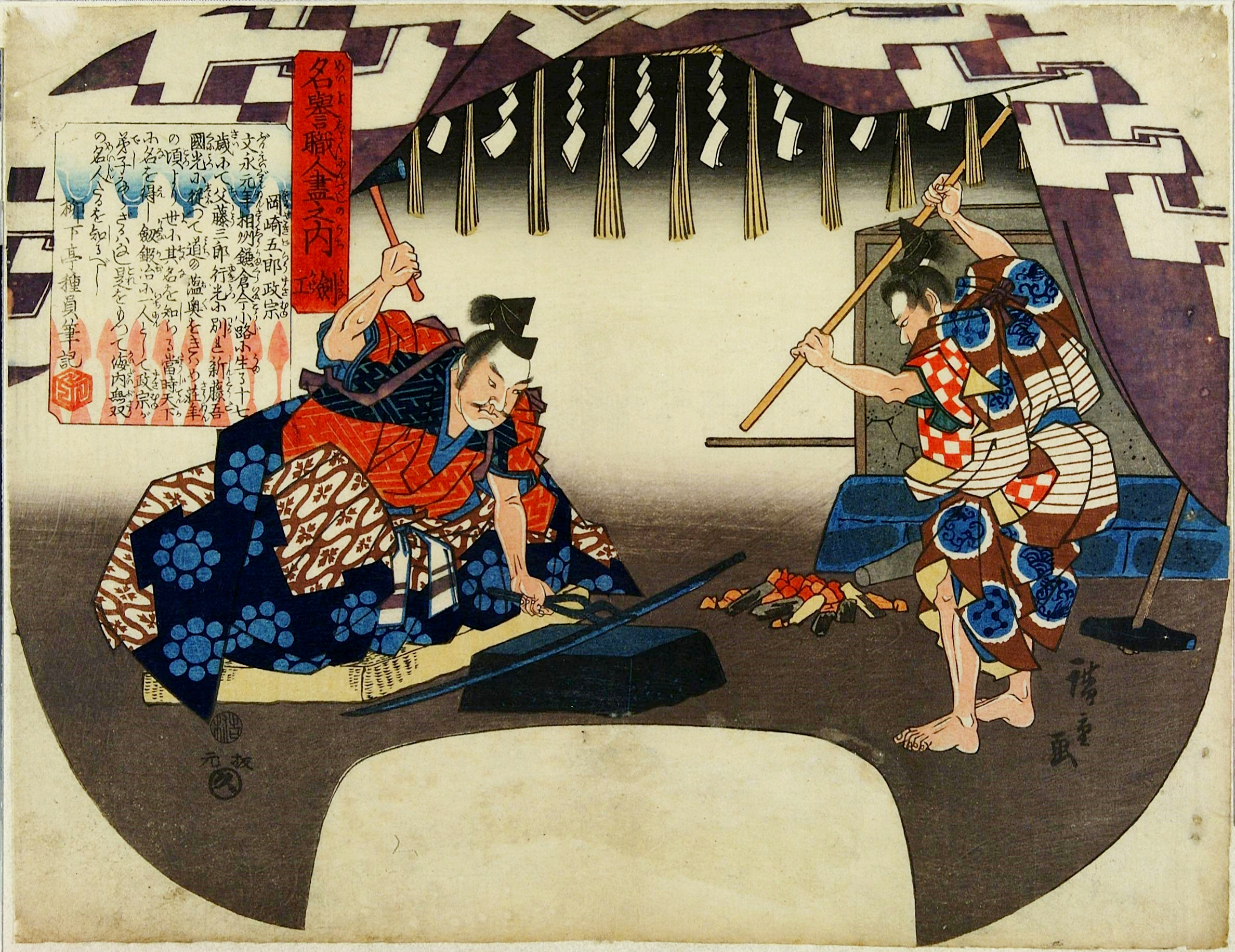
Masamune forges a katana with an assistant (Ukiyo-e, 18th–19th century)

Masamune is believed to have trained a great number of sword smiths; 15 are known, 10 of whom are considered to be the Juttetsu (正宗十哲) or "Ten Famous Students" or "10 Great Disciples of Masamune".

=== Great Juttetsu ===
==== Chogi ====
(備州長船住長義作—Bishu Osafune Ju Nagayoshi Saku) (備州國長船住長義—Bizen Kuni Osafune Ju Nagayoshi)
Although probably not a direct student of Masamune because of the dates when he was forging, his works are greatly influenced by Masamune's work and the Soshu tradition as well as the work of the Soden Bizen swordsmiths. Though the kanji characters are pronounced in Japanese as 'Nagayoshi', by convention the on'yomi (Sino-Japanese reading) pronunciation of 'Chogi' is used for this smith and a handful of others (less commonly for his student Kanenaga, pronounced in on'yomi as 'Kencho').

==== Kanemitsu ====
(備前國長船住兼光—Bizen Kuni Osafune Ju Kanemitsu) (備前長船住兼光—Bishu Osafune ju Kanemitsu) (備前國長船住左衛門尉藤原兼光—Bizen no Kuni Osafune ju Saemonjo Fujiwara Kanemitsu)
Considered to have created some of the sharpest swords ever known, he is one of a handful of smiths rated at Sai-jo O-wazamono (grandmaster of great sharpness) with famous swords named Kabutowari (Helmet Cutter), Ishikiri (Stone Cutter), and Teppokiri (Gun Cutter) as relayed in Fujishiro's writings. Kanemitsu produced swords used by renowned men and generals. He likely was not taught directly by Masamune, however, but was influenced by the Soshu, crafting swords in addition to serving himself as a leader in the Soden Bizen revolution.

==== Shizu Saburo Kaneuji ====
(兼氏—Kaneuji)
Lived in Yamato province before going to Mino to study under Masamune where his style radically changed. His swords are most like those of Masamune and quite often confused with his. The Mishina school can trace its history back to Kaneuji and Masamune.

==== Kinju ====
(金重)
Kinju, like Chogi, by convention is pronounced in on'yomi. He is also known as Kaneshige using the Japanese pronunciation of his name. He and Kaneuji are founders of the Mino style. He was a monk at the Seisen-ji in Tsuruga and led to the creation of Echizen swordmaking like Kuniyuki, moving to Mino around the time of Ryakuo (1338–1342) creating the Seki tradition.

==== Kunishige ====
(長谷部国重—Hasebe Kunishige)
Created the Hasebe school producing swords in the style of the second period of Soshu and Yamashiro. His swords are considered by some to be equal to Akihiro and Hiromitsu. He created the Heshikiri Hasebe (The Forceful Cutter) listed in the Kyoho Meibutsu Cho, owned by Toyotomi Hideyoshi and then by Oda Nobunaga. It bears a gold appraisal inlay of Honami Kotoku called a Kinzogan (金象嵌). Today the sword is a family heirloom of the Kuroda Daimyō Ke. The sword takes its name from the story of Oda Nobunaga drawing it to cut through a table to kill Kannai, a tea master who betrayed him.

==== Kunitsugu ====
(来源国次—Rai Minamoto Kunitsugu)
Also goes by the name Kamakura Rai as he is the grandson of Rai Kuniyuki. The influence of the Soshu and Yamashiro traditions can be observed in his works.

==== Saemonzaburo ====
(左—Sa) (筑州左—Chikushu Sa) (筑前國住左—Chikuzen no Kuni ju Sa)
Believed to go by the name Yasuyoshi but signed his work using the first two letters of his given name. Considered by some to be one of the greatest of Masamune's students. As well as being a Soshu swordsmith he also created the Chikuzen tradition.

==== Saeki Norishige ====
(則重—Norishige, 佐伯—Saeki)
Historically considered one of the best of Masamune's students, he is numbered among the Juttetsu. However, current research indicates that he was a senior student to Masamune, junior to Yukimitsu, under the great teacher Shintōgo Kunimitsu. He, like Go, hailed from Etchu province and is well known as the only smith to have mastered the style of matsukawa-hada (pine tree bark pattern steel), making his work unique.

==== Go Yoshihiro ====
(郷(江)—Go, 義弘—Yoshihiro)
Very few works exist by this swordsmith because of his death at age 27. No known signed works exist. He is believed to have gone by the name of Go Yoshihiro or simply Go, the name of the town from which he came. As well as being a Soshu swordsmith he is a member of the Etchu tradition. He is considered to have the highest skill in forging swords among the Masamune Juttetsu .

==== Naotsuna ====
(石州出羽直綱作—Sekishu Izuwa Naotsuna Saku) (直綱作—Naotsuna Saku)
Considered a pupil of Masamune since the publication of Nōami Hon Mei-zukushi, in Bunmei 15th year (1483). His style was influenced by the Soshu(相州), Soden Bizen(備前) and Iwami province (石州) style. Fujishiro questioned whether Naotsuna was a disciple of Masamune. His theory however ran counter to contemporary evidence, genealogical dates, and the signed tachi Tokubetsu Juyo #4 Naotsuna (shodai) signed with „Naotsuna“ (直綱) cited by the NBTHK as showing a strong connection to Masamune.

=== Other students ===
- Hiromitsu (相模國住人廣光—Sagami Kuni Junin Hiromitsu): Along with Akihiro brought about the second period of the Soshu style.
- Hikoshiro Sadamune: A student and the son or adopted son of Masamune. Like his father he left no signed work but is considered peerless in the Soshu tradition after Masamune. Sadamune was slightly less skilled than his great father.
- Akihiro (相州住秋廣—Soshu Ju Akihiro) (相模國住人秋廣—Sagami Kuni Junin Akihiro): A direct student of Masamune, along with Hiromitsu was responsible for refining the Soshu style to create the Soshu second period.

== See also ==
- Hikoshiro Hiromitsu
- List of Wazamono
- Muramasa – Japanese swordsmith
- Murasame
