= Hikoshiro Sadamune =

Japanese swordsmith

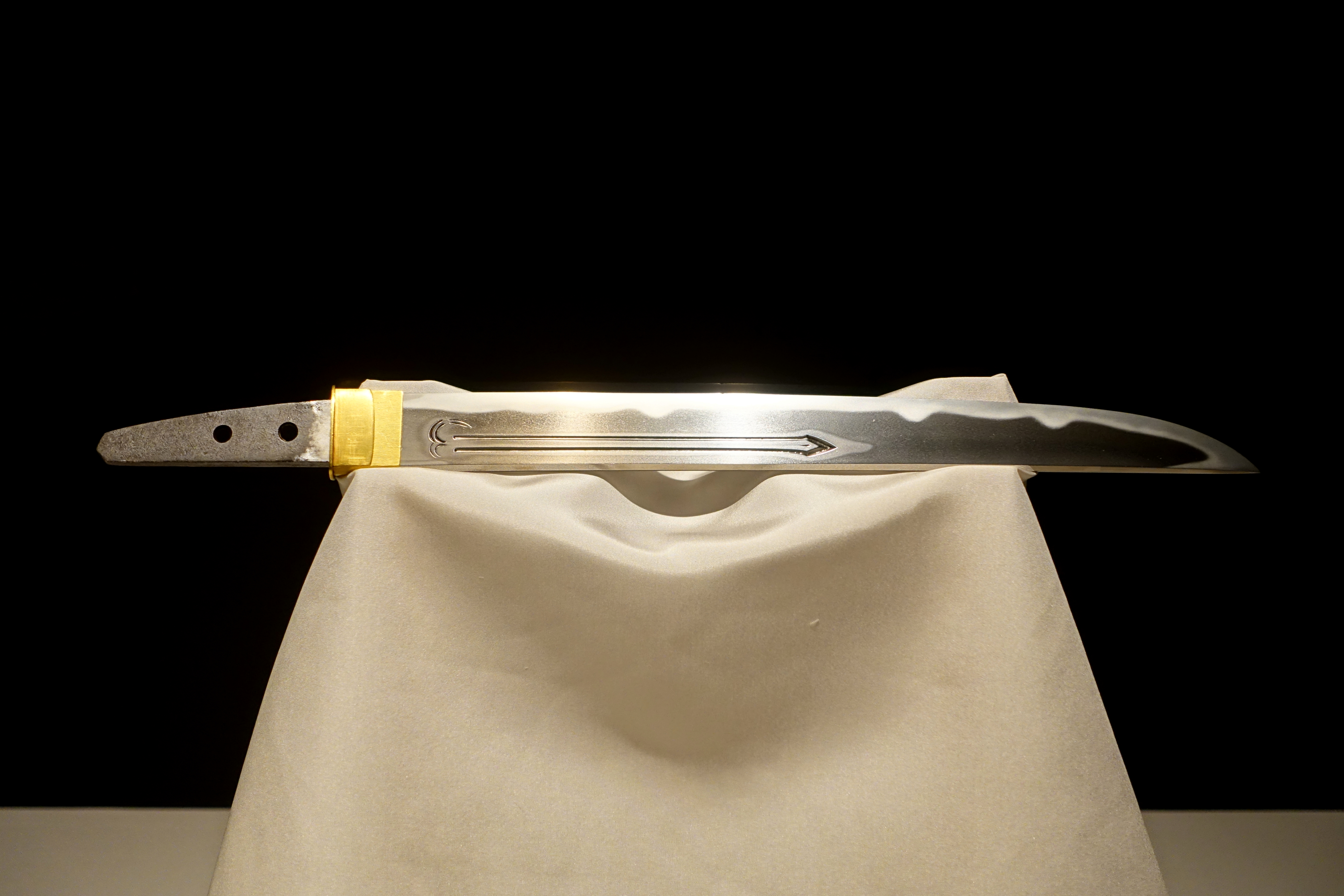
Tantō Terasawa Sadamune, National Treasure, Tokyo National Museum

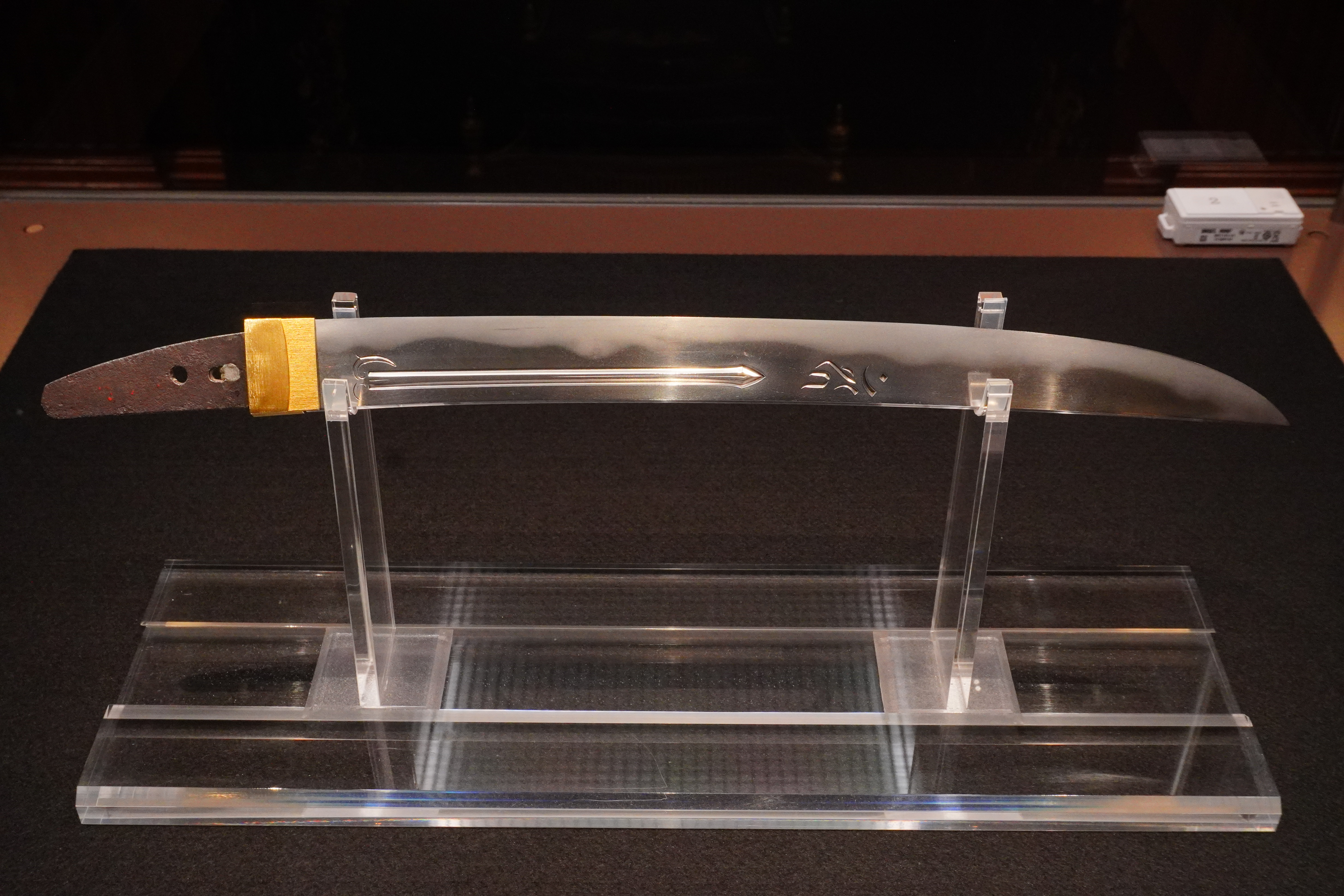
Tantō Tokuzenin Sadamune, National Treasure, Mitsui Memorial Museum

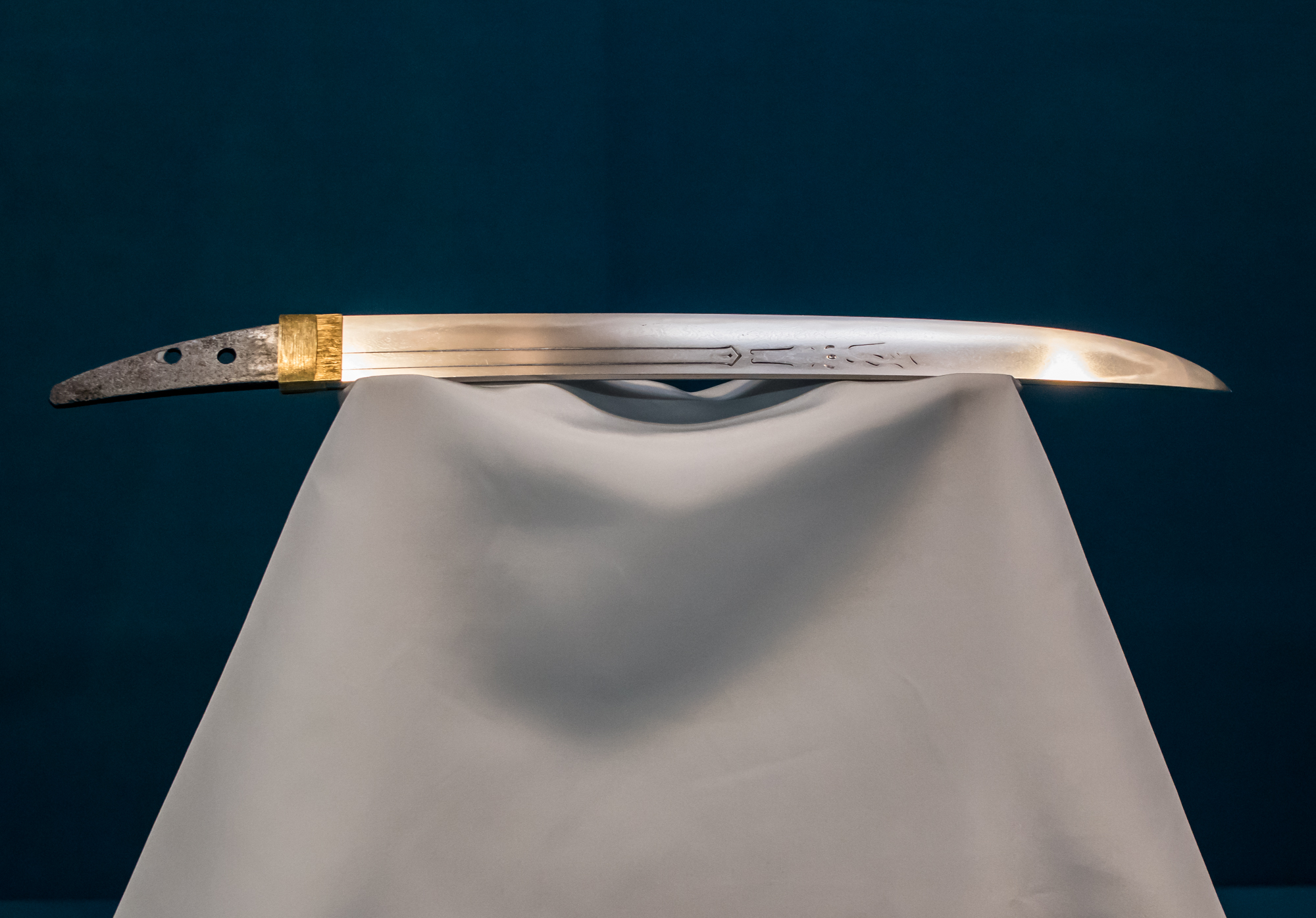
Wakizashi Ishida Sadamune, Important Cultural Property, Tokyo National Museum

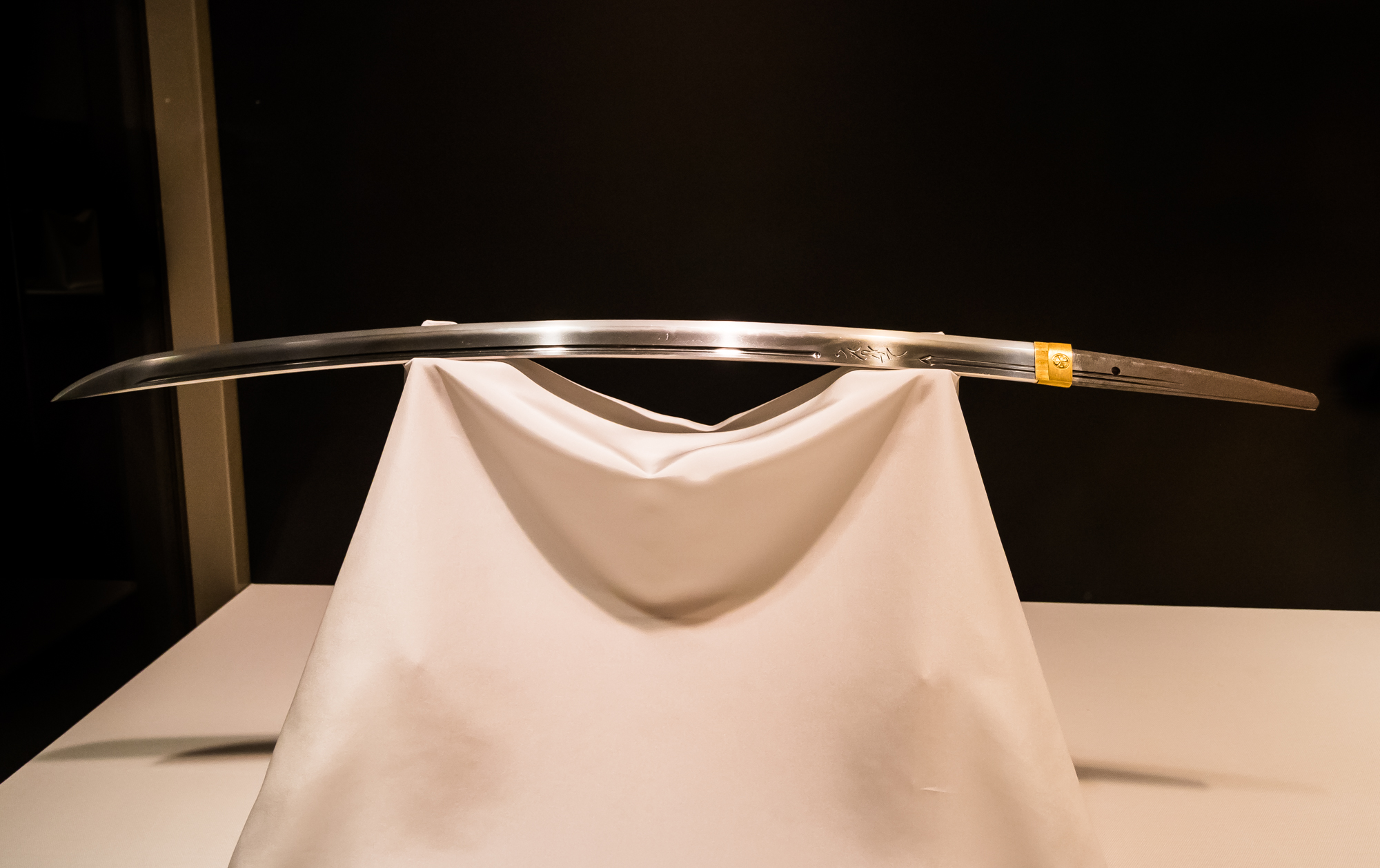
A katana modified from a tachi, Kiriha Sadamune, Important Cultural Property, Tokyo National Museum

Hikoshirō Sadamune (相模國住人貞宗 - Sagami kuni junin Sadamune; born 1298 Einin – 1349 in Shōhei) also called Sōshū Sadamune was a swordsmith of the Sōshū school, originally from Gōshū (also known as Ōmi province) whose works are considered some of the finest blades ever created. His works are often compared with those of the other great Koto era (987-1596) swordsmiths including Sōshū Masamune, Toshiro Yoshimitsu, Go Yoshihiro, Bizen Nagamitsu, and Ise Muramasa. He was a son by blood or adoption of Sōshū Masamune considered by many to be the most famous of the Sōshū masters.

After leaving Gōshū province to go to what is now Kanagawa Prefecture, Sadamune became a student of Masamune, sometime around the Namboku-chō era. As a mark of his completion of his teacher's training he inherited the mune part of his name Sadamune from Masamune. Sadamune was not one of the Great Juttetsu trained by Masamune, but his works were regarded to be of the same level as his master's.

== Students ==
Sōshū Sadamune is believed at the present time to have trained four students Nobukuni (信国) who formed a long lineage of swordsmiths under the same name, Nobukuni famous for his horimono images carved into the blades, and Takagi Sadamune (江州□住貞宗 - goshu takaki ju Sadamune).

A great debate exists in the academic community about Takagi Sadamune. It is uncertain if Takagi Sadamune is simply Sōshū Sadamune after he returned to his home region, a son of his or someone who he taught sword making. The swords of Takagi Sadamune are not considered to be as high a quality as those produced by Sōshū Sadamune but are still of exceptional skill.

One signed copy of his work exists: a tantō blade, formerly owned by Toyotomi Hideyoshi. The work signed Gōshū Takagi ju Sadamune is said to have been made when Sōshū Sadamune returned home to Takagi in Gōshū province. Legend says he returned home to produce a copy of a famous sword called the Ropecutter.

He also trained Kanro Toshinaga who is believed to have worked in Echigo province in the Nanboku-chō period.

Higo Munekage (Higo No-Kuni Kumamoto-Kishi, Hagi Jiemon No-Sho Fujiwara Munekage Saku) who was a student of Suishinshi Masahide takes a great influence from Sadamune in his work, but wasn't a student of his.Higo Munekage Katana

Kokon Mei Zukushi and other books listing Japanese sword smiths and blades list Motoshige as a student of Sadamune however Dr. Honma Junji disagrees with this in his book Nihon Koto Shi (History of Koto) By Dr. Honma Junji

== See also ==
- Masamune
- List of Wazamono
- Tantō
