= Wakizashi =

Shorter sword in a daishō (Japanese)

Wakizashi (脇差)
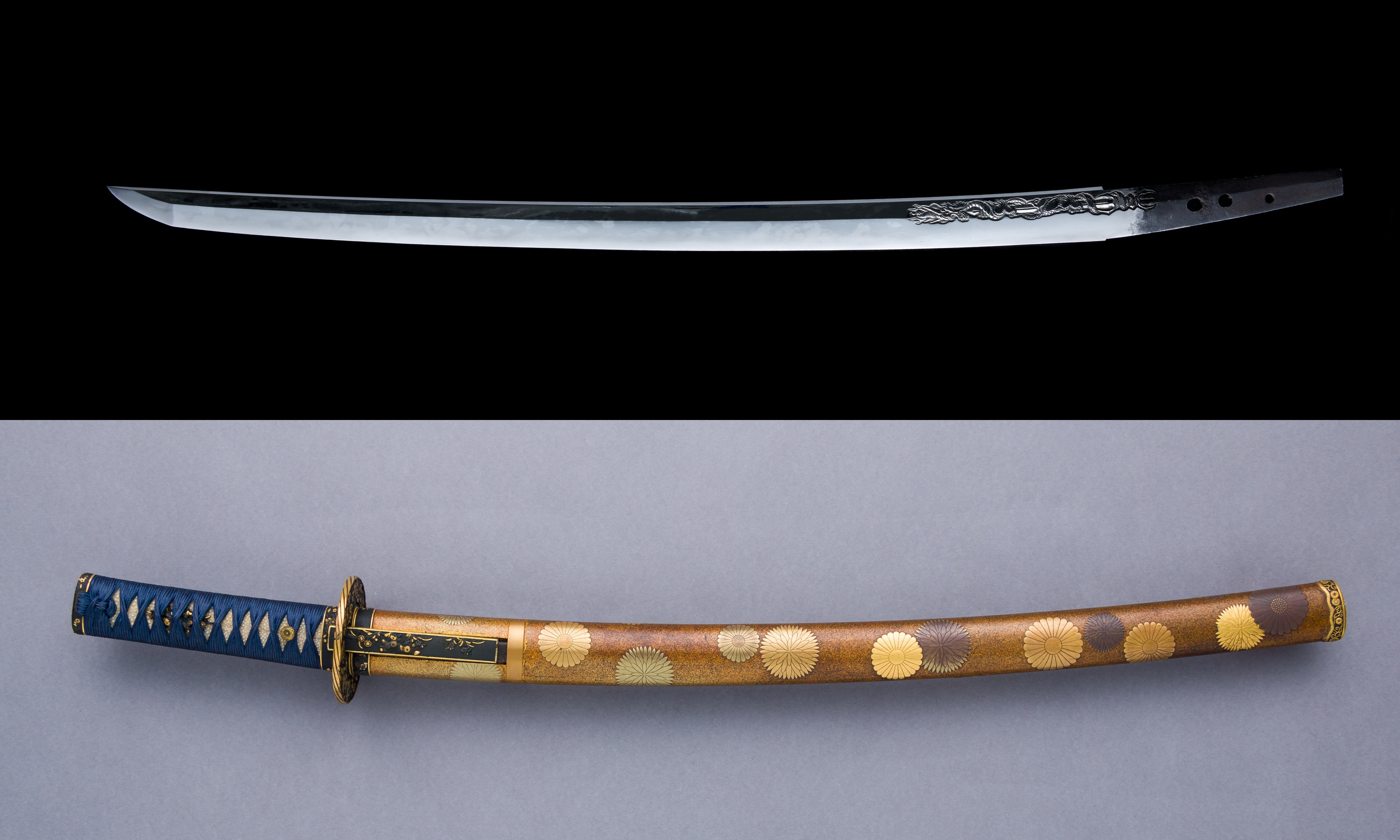
- Blade and mounting for a wakizashi. The blade was made by Soshu Fusamune. Blade, late 15th–early 16th century; mounting, 18th century. There were many different makers for the katana. The Metropolitan Museum of Art
- Type: Sword
- Place of origin: Japan

Production history
- Produced: Muromachi period (1336–1573) to present

Specifications
- Blade length: approx. 30–60 cm (12–24 in)
- Blade type: Curved, single-edged
- Scabbard/sheath: Lacquered wood

The wakizashi (Japanese: 脇差; lit. 'side-inserted') is one of the traditionally made Japanese swords (nihontō) worn by the samurai in feudal Japan. Its name refers to the practice of wearing it inserted through one's obi or sash at one's side, whereas the larger tachi sword was worn slung from a cord.

== History ==
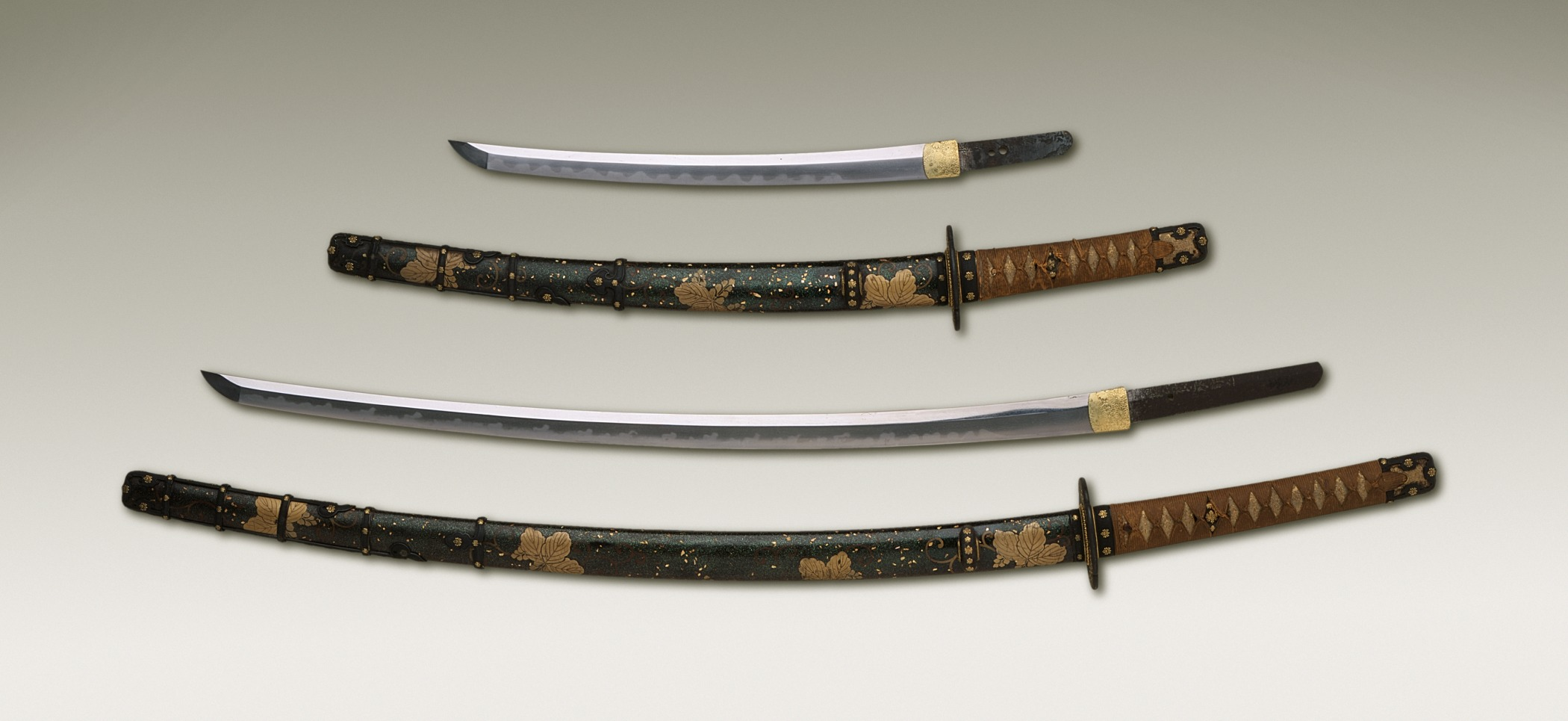
Antique Japanese daishō, the traditional pairing of two Japanese swords which were the symbol of the samurai, showing the traditional Japanese sword cases (koshirae) and the difference in size between the katana (bottom) and the smaller wakizashi (top).

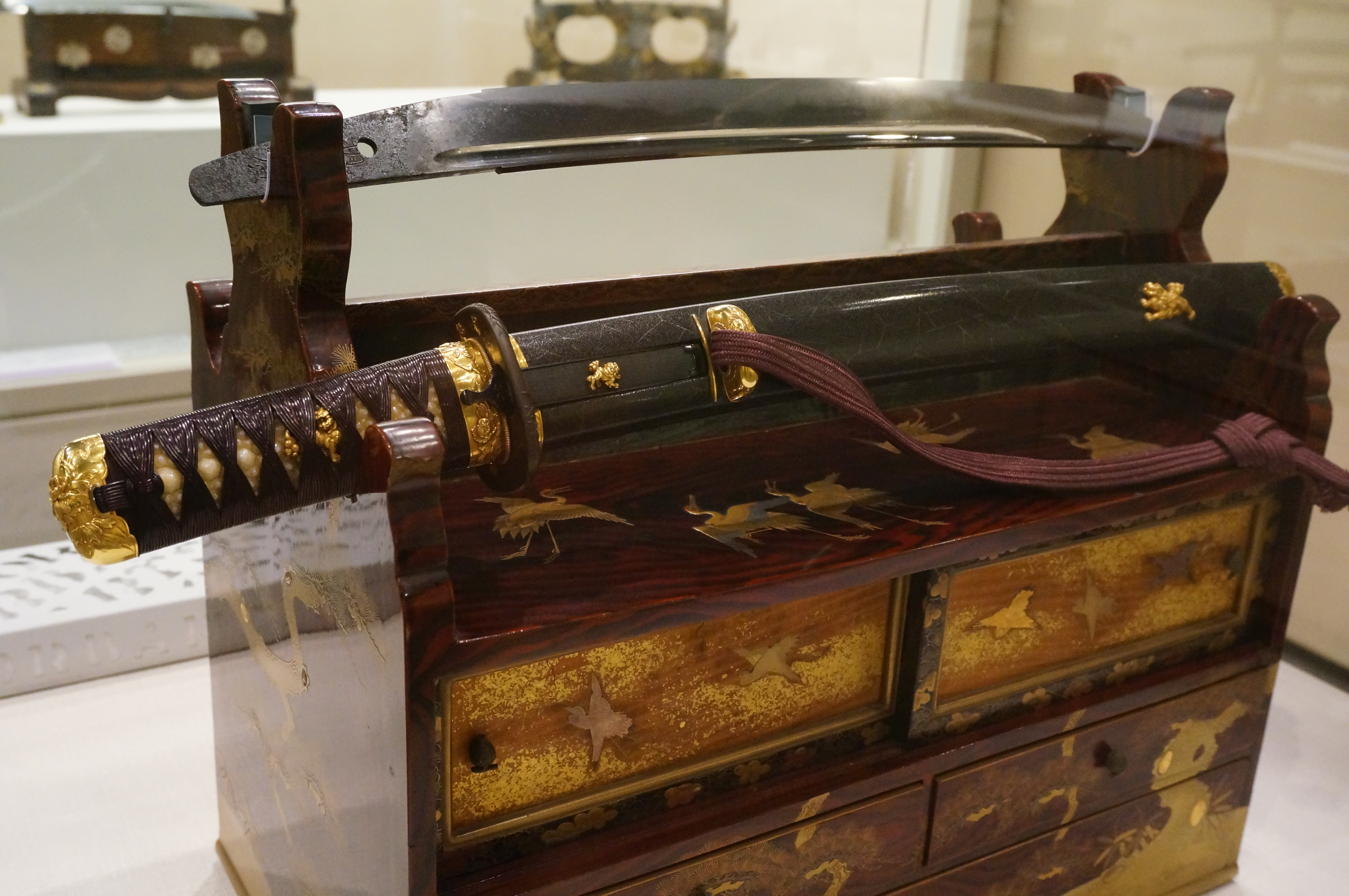
Although the number of forged swords decreased in the Meiji period, many artistically excellent mountings were made. A wakizashi forged by Soshu Akihiro. Nanboku-chō period (top). Wakizashi mounting, Early Meiji period (bottom).

The production of swords in Japan is divided into specific time periods:

- Jokotō (ancient swords, until around AD 900)
- Kotō (old swords from around 900–1596)
- Shintō (new swords 1596–1780)
- Shinshintō (newer swords 1781–1876)
- Gendaitō (modern or contemporary swords 1876–present)

Wakizashi have been in use as far back as the 15th or 16th century.

The term wakizashi did not originally specify swords of any official blade length and was an abbreviation of wakizashi no katana ("sword thrust at one's side"). The term was applied to companion swords of all sizes.

However, it was not until the Edo period in 1638 when the rulers of Japan tried to regulate the types of swords and the social strata which were allowed to wear them that the lengths of katana and wakizashi were officially set.

== Design ==
The wakizashi has a blade between 30 and 60 cm (12 and 24 in) in length. Wakizashi are not necessarily just a smaller version of the katana; they could be forged differently and have a different cross-section.

Wakizashi were worn on the left side, secured to the waist sash (Uwa-obi or himo).

=== Variants ===
Wakizashi close to the length of a katana are called ō-wakizashi.

Wakizashi closer to the length of a tantō are called ko-wakizashi.

== Usage ==
=== By samurai ===
The wakizashi was used as a backup or auxiliary sword; it was also used for close quarters fighting, to behead a defeated opponent and sometimes to perform seppuku.

The wakizashi was one of several short swords available for use by samurai including the yoroi tōshi, and the chisa-katana.

During the Edo period, the Tokugawa shogunate required samurai to wear Katana and shorter swords in pairs. These short swords were wakizashi and tanto, and wakizashi were mainly selected.

The wakizashi being worn together with the katana was the official sign that the wearer was a samurai. When worn together, the pair of swords were called daishō, which translates literally as "big-little". Only samurai could wear the daishō: it represented their social power and personal honour.

Kanzan Satō, in his book titled The Japanese Sword, notes that there did not seem to be any particular need for the wakizashi and suggests that the wakizashi may have become more popular than the tantō because it was more suited for indoor fighting. He mentions the custom of leaving the katana at the door of a castle or palace when entering, while continuing to wear the wakizashi inside.

=== By civilians ===
During the Edo period, commoners were allowed to wear one legal-length ko-wakizashi, which made it popular for the general public to wear wakizashi. This was common when traveling because of the risk of encountering bandits.

During a speech at Hibiya Public Hall in Tokyo on 12 October 1960, Inejiro Asanuma, the chairman of the Japan Socialist Party, was assassinated by 17 year old Otoya Yamaguchi, who used a wakizashi.

== Gallery ==
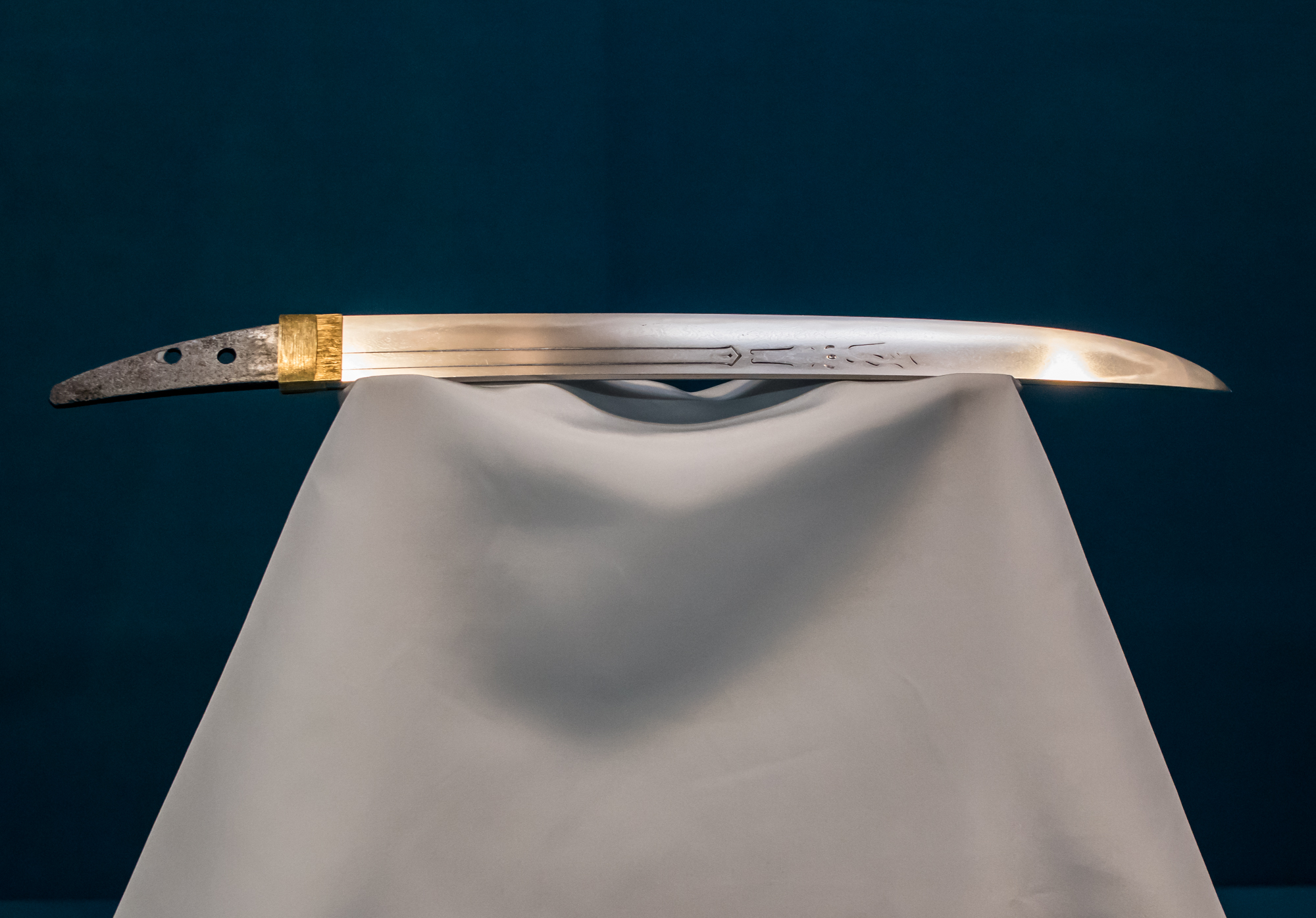
Wakizashi Ishida Sadamune made by Sadamune. Nanboku-chō period. Important Cultural Property. Tokyo National Museum.

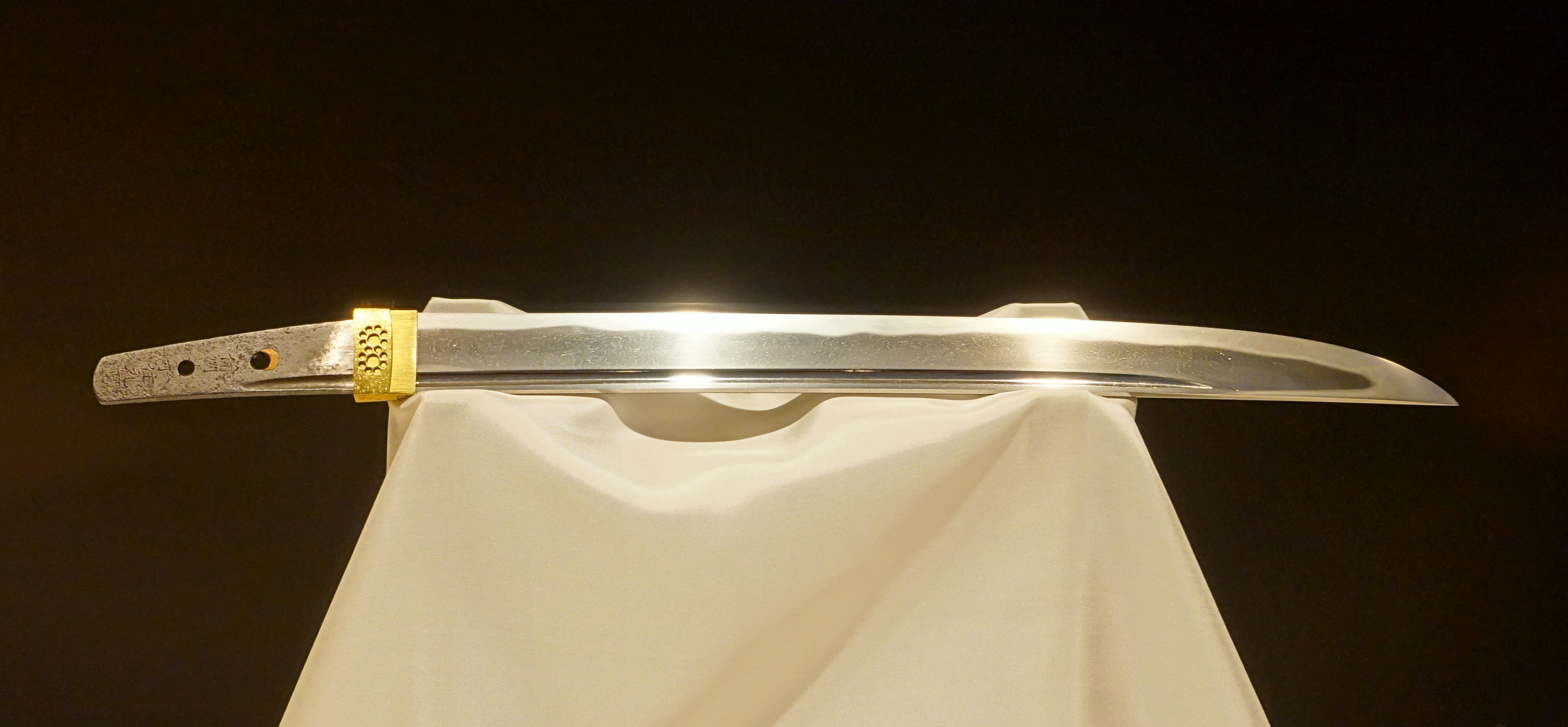
Wakizashi made by Osafune Motoshige. Nanboku-chō period. Tokyo National Museum.

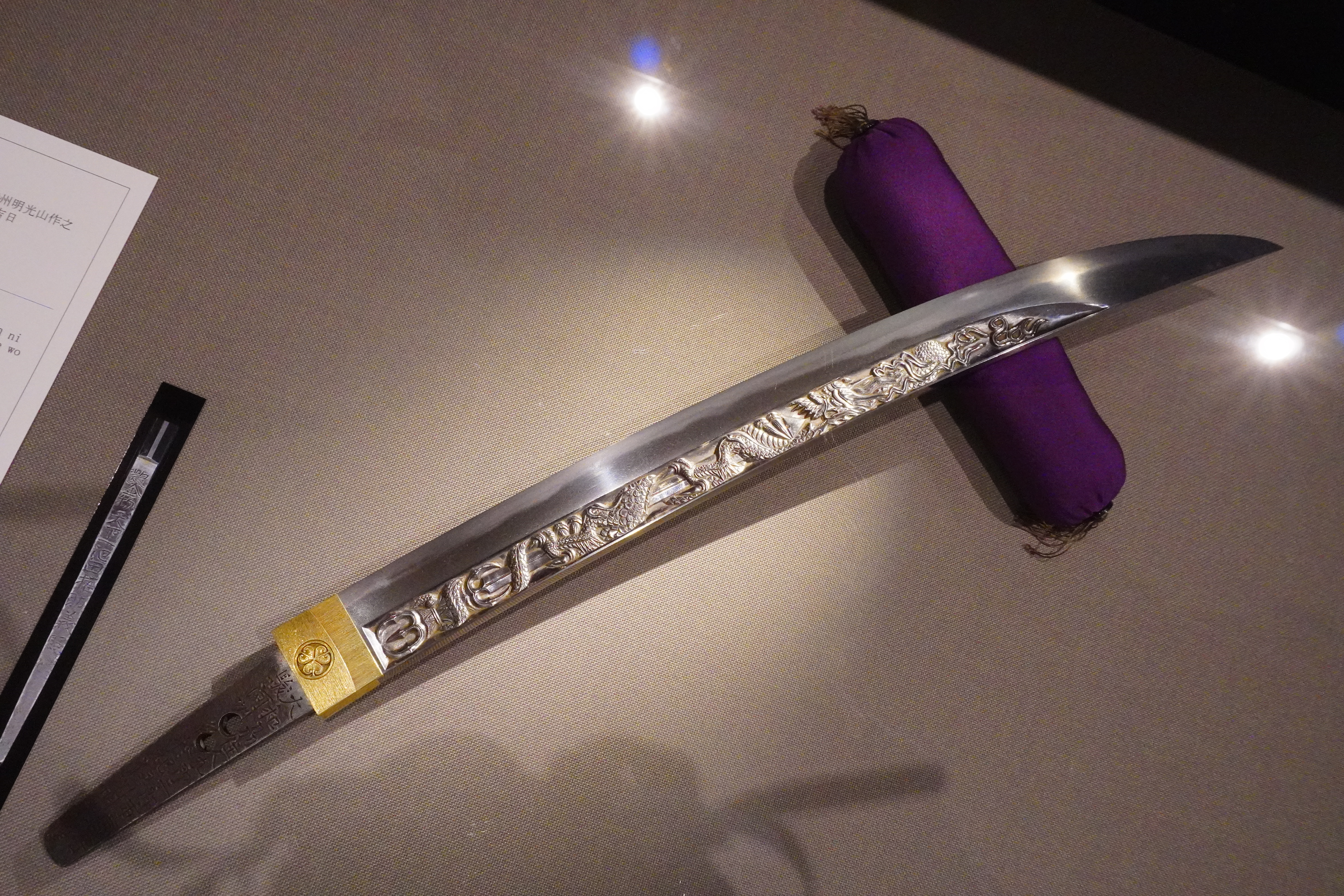
Wakizashi forged by Nanki Shigekuni (ja) with a horimono engraved on the blade by Ikeda Gonsuke Yoshiteru. Edo period, 1622, Important Sword

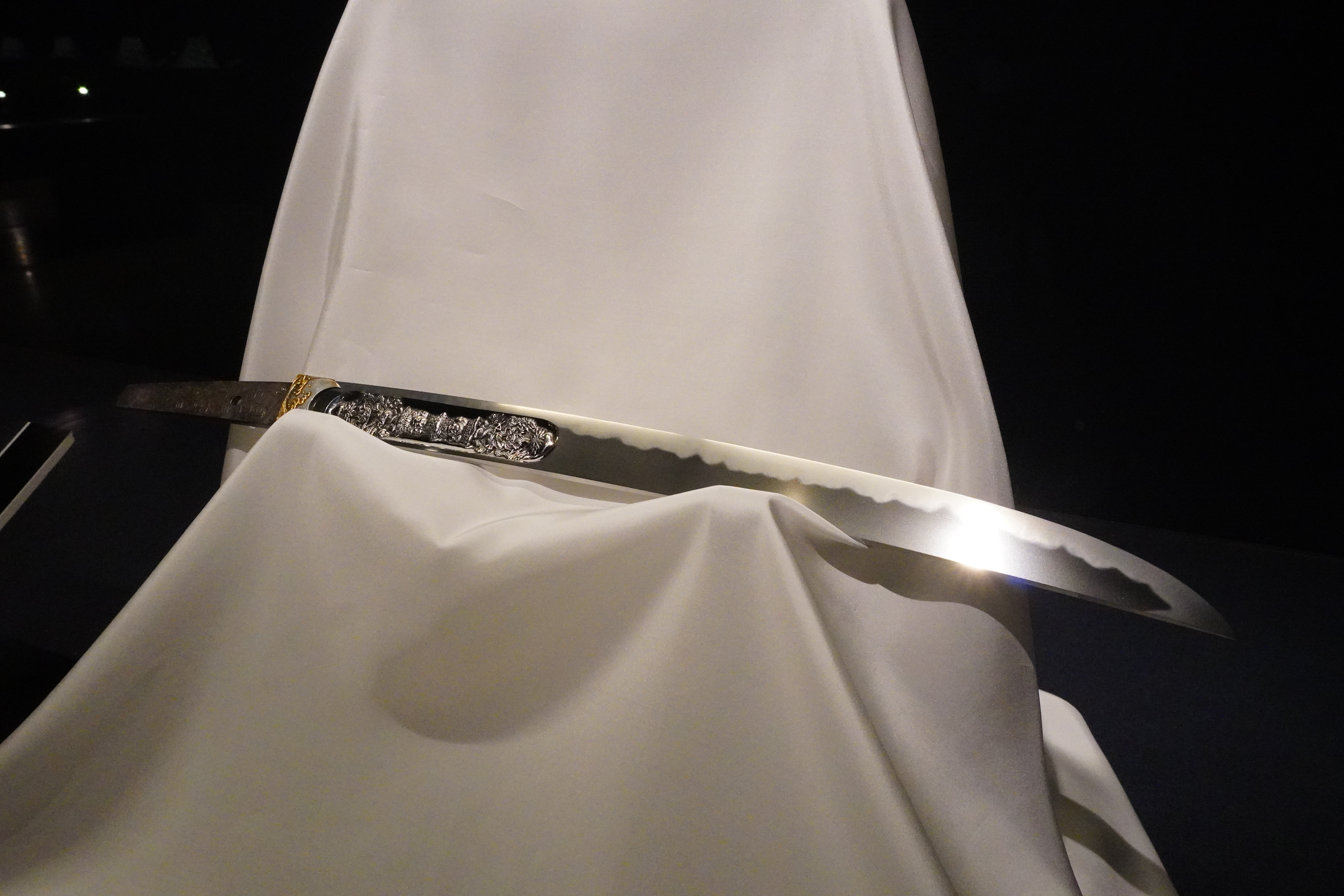
Wakizashi forged by Koyama Sōbei Munetsugu with a horimono engraved on the blade by Shōji Zenbei Nobutatsu. Edo period,

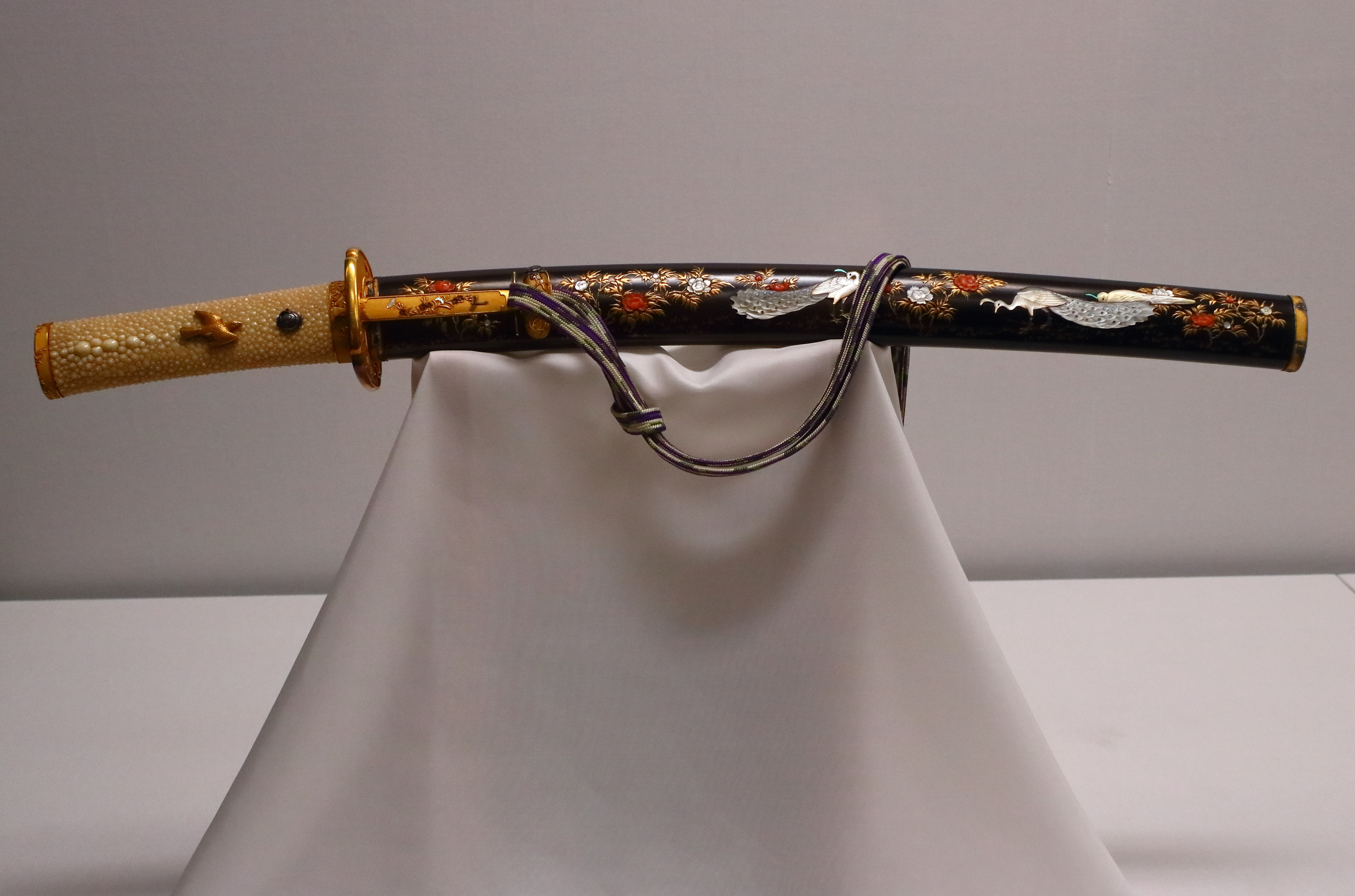
Wakizashi mounting. The metal parts are made by Goto Ichijo. Edo period. Tokyo National Museum.

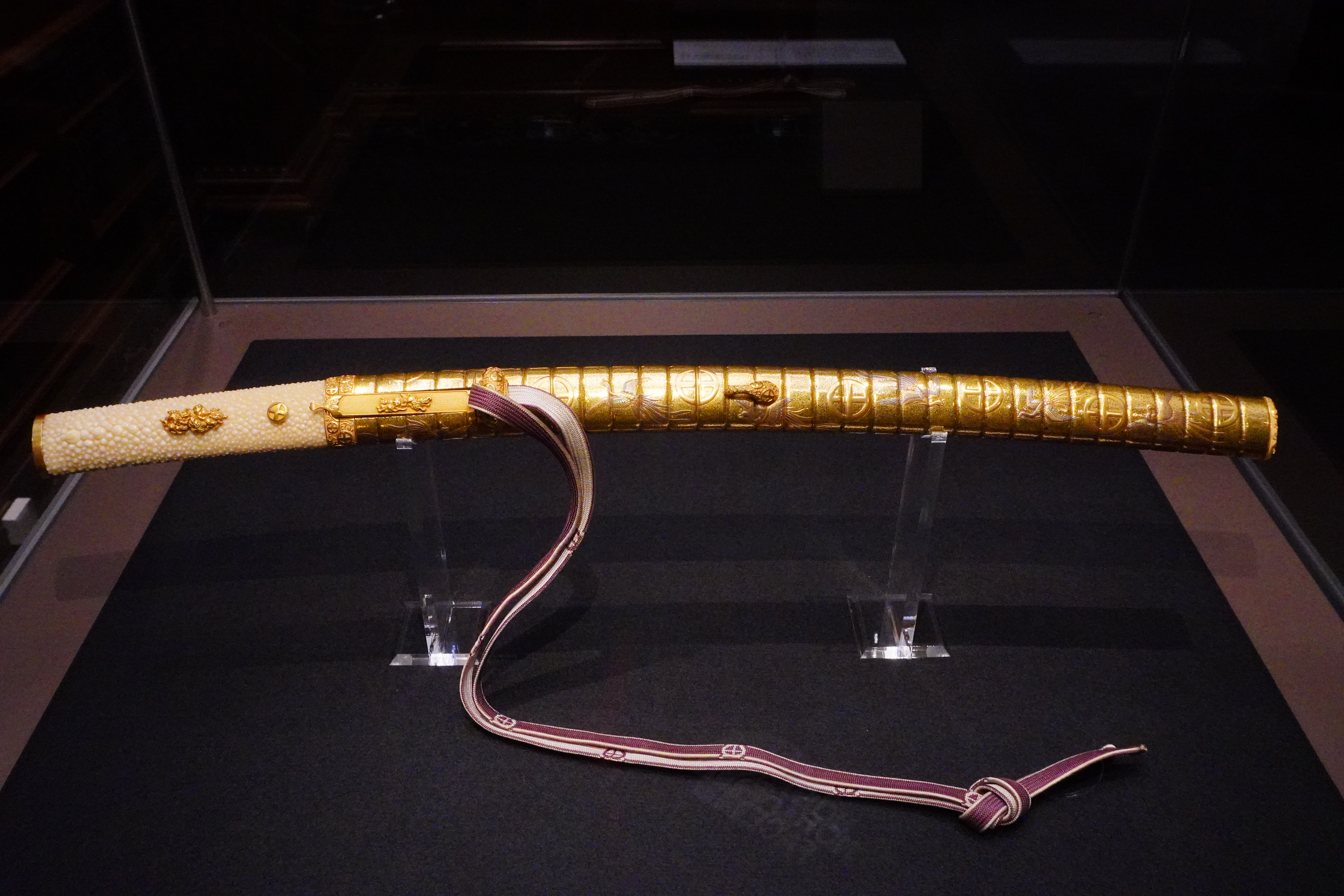
Koshirae (mounting) for a wakizashi Sairen featuring the Shimazu clan's mon (family crest), Edo period, Mitsui Memorial Museum

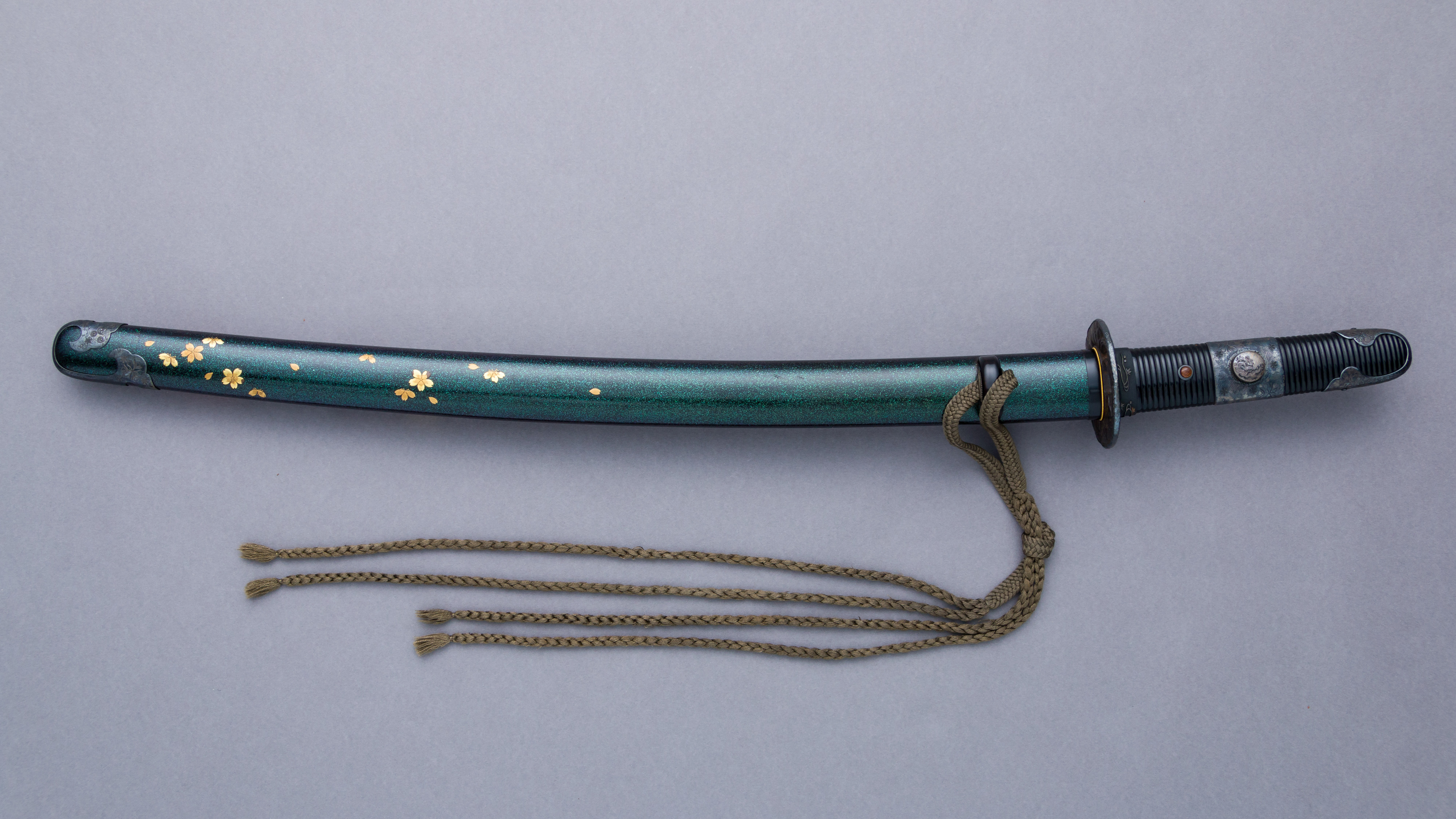
Wakizashi mounting. Edo period. The Metropolitan Museum of Art.

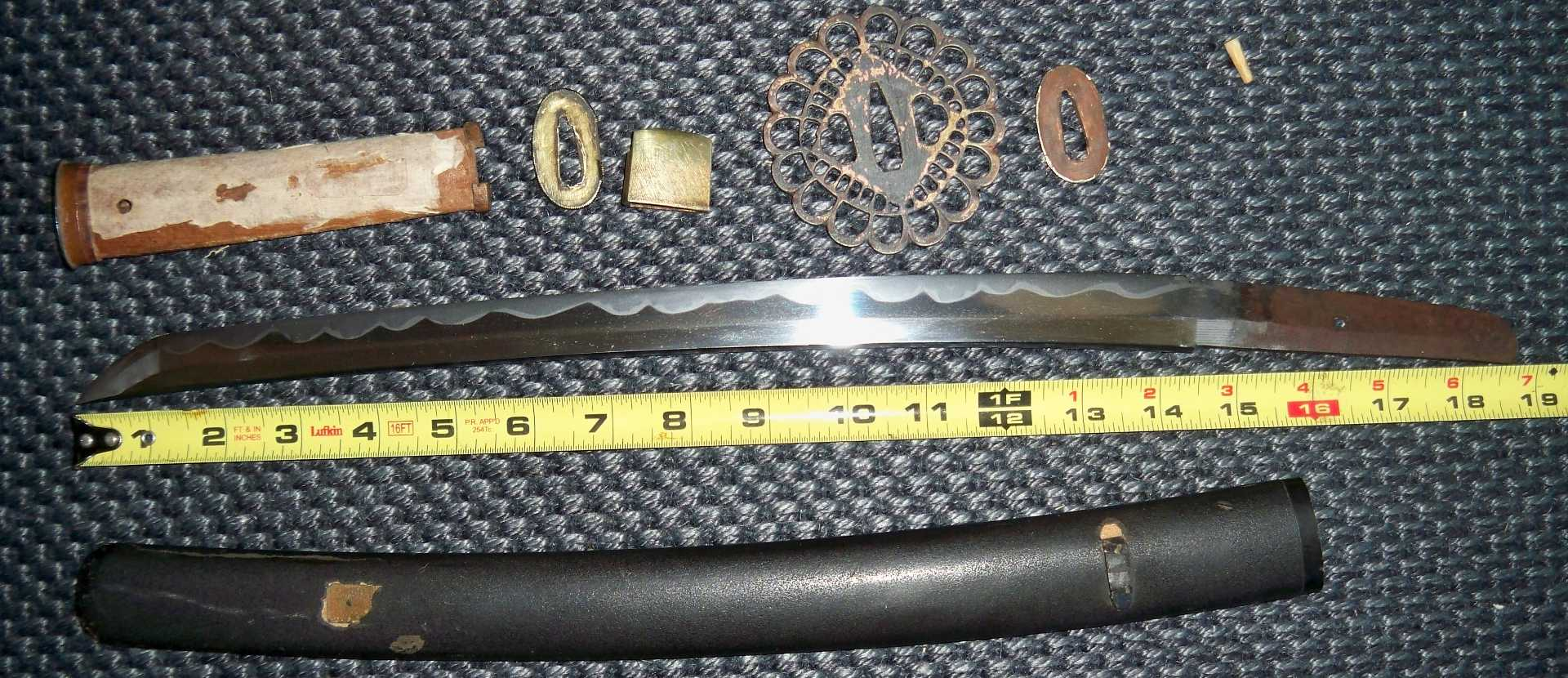
An antique Japanese wakizashi with koshirae and related parts, shown disassembled. The hamon (temper line) is clearly visible.

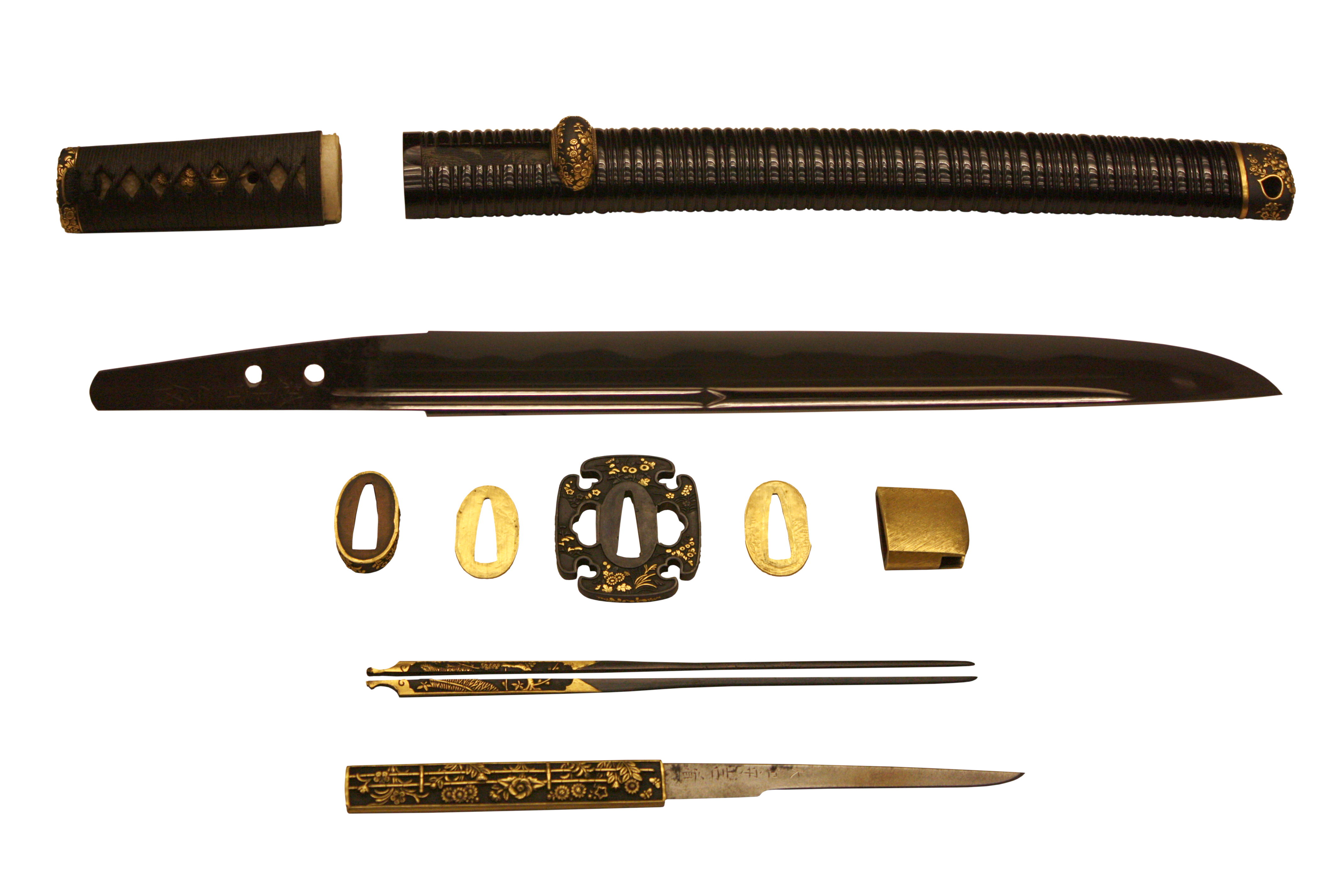
Wakisashi by Sanpin Masatoshi, early 1600s. The disassembled koshirae shows the tsuba (guard), the twin kōgai (hair pin) and the kozuka (small knife). On display at the British Museum.

== See also ==
- Japanese sword mountings
- Kodachi
- Ōdachi
- Tsurugi
