= Motoshige =

- Gender: Male

Origin
- Origin: Japanese
- Meaning: Different meanings depending on the kanji used

Motoshige (written: 職鎮) is a masculine Japanese given name. Notable people with the name include:

- Kojima Motoshige (小島 職鎮), Japanese samurai
- Nabeshima Motoshige (1602–1654), Japanese daimyō
