= Hiromitsu =

- Pronunciation: HEE-row-mee-tsoo
- Gender: Male

Origin
- Origin: Japanese
- Meaning: Different meanings depending on the kanji used

Hiromitsu (written: 博光, 博満, 宏光, 宏充, 弘光, 広光, 洋光 or 洋充) is a masculine Japanese given name. Notable people with the name include:

- Hiromitsu Agatsuma (上妻 宏光; born 1973), Japanese shamisen player
- Hiromitsu "Hiro-x" Aoki, J-pop musical artist
- Hiromitsu Horiike (堀池 洋充; born 1971), Japanese footballer
- Hiromitsu Isogai (礒貝 洋光; born 1969), Japanese footballer
- Hiromitsu Kadota (門田 博光; born 1948), Japanese baseball player
- Hiromitsu Kanehara (金原 弘光; born 1970), Japanese martial artist
- Hiromitsu Kanki (神吉 宏充; born 1940), Japanese shogi player
- Kitaseumi Hiromitsu (北瀬海 弘光; born 1948), Japanese sumo wrestler
- Hiromitsu Kitayama (北山 宏光; born 1985), Japanese idol, singer and actor
- Hiromitsu Miura (三浦 広光; born 1981), Japanese boxer and mixed martial artist
- Hiromitsu Ochiai (落合 博満; born 1953), Japanese baseball player and manager
- Hiromitsu Takahashi (高橋 宏光; born 1959), Japanese printmaker, often known simply as Hiromitsu
- Yutakayama Hiromitsu (豊山 広光; born 1947), Japanese sumo wrestler
