= Mitsui Memorial Museum =

Mitsui Memorial Museum 三井記念美術館
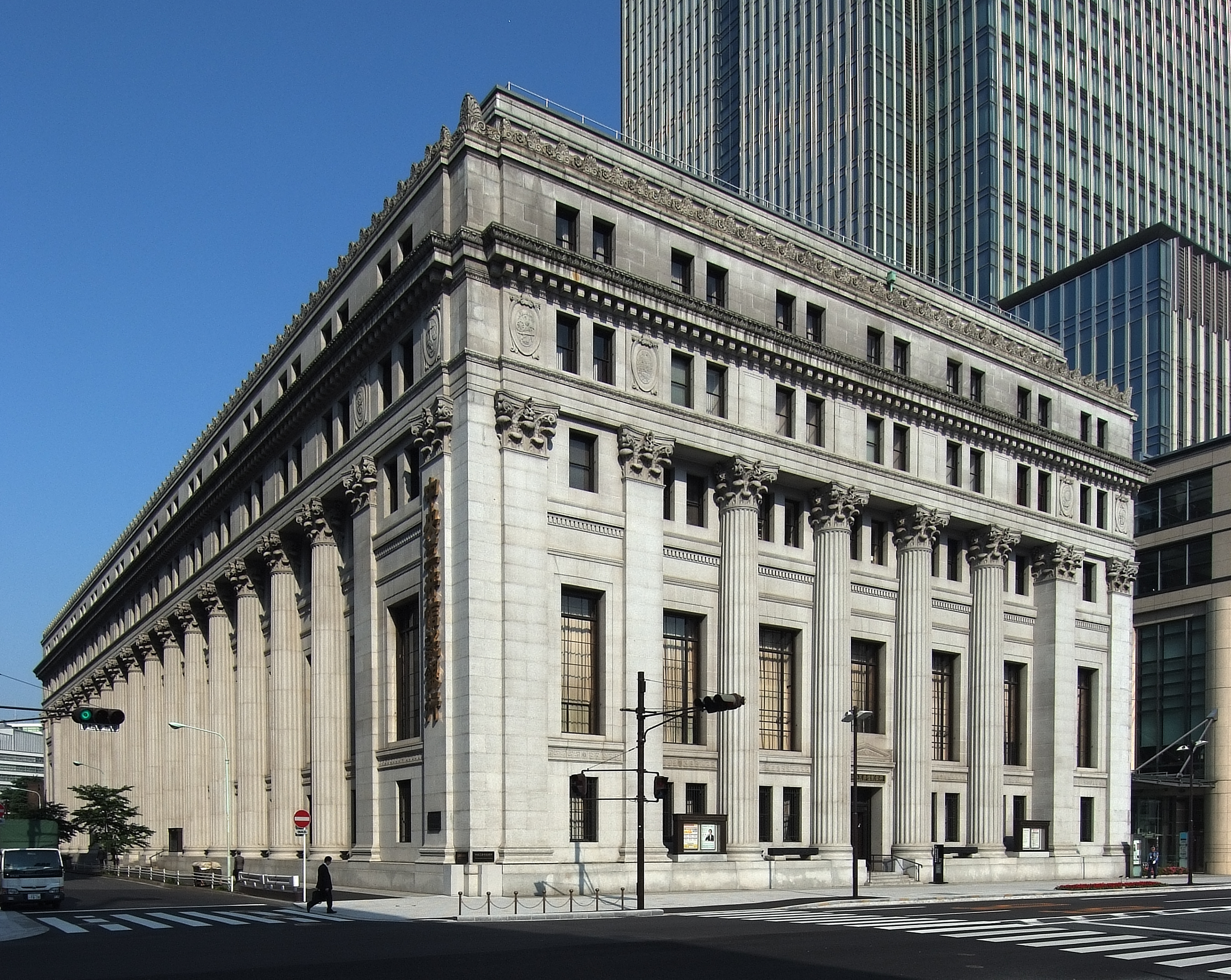

- Location within Tokyo Yamanote Loop Location within Tokyo wards area
- Established: October 8, 2005
- Location: Nihonbashi area of Chuo, Tokyo, Japan
- Coordinates: 35.686298°N 139.773144°E
- Type: Art museum
- Website: English - Japanese

The Mitsui Memorial Museum (三井記念美術館, Mitsui Kinen Bijutsukan) is an art museum in Tokyo's Nihonbashi district. It is located within the Mitsui Main Building, an Important Cultural Property as designated by the Japanese government.

== Collection ==
The museum's collection includes items used in the Japanese tea ceremony as well as Eastern antiques. The museum houses more than 4,000 cultural objects, six of which have been designated by the Japanese government as National Treasures, 75 as Important Cultural Properties, and 4 as Important Art Objects (ja).

The museum also publishes a number of books about its collections.

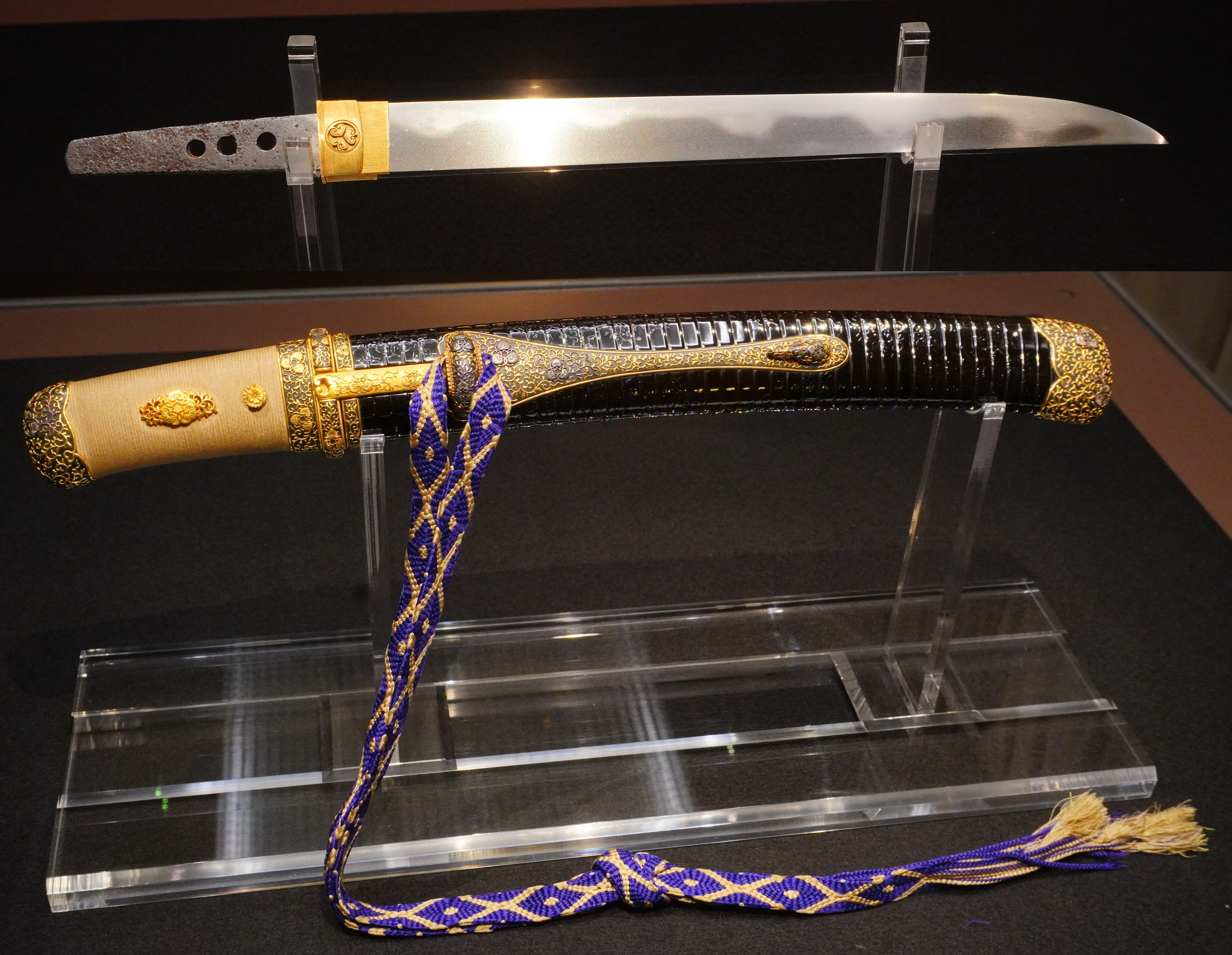
Tantō Hyuga Masamune with koshirae (mounting) and kumihimo cord, National Treasure

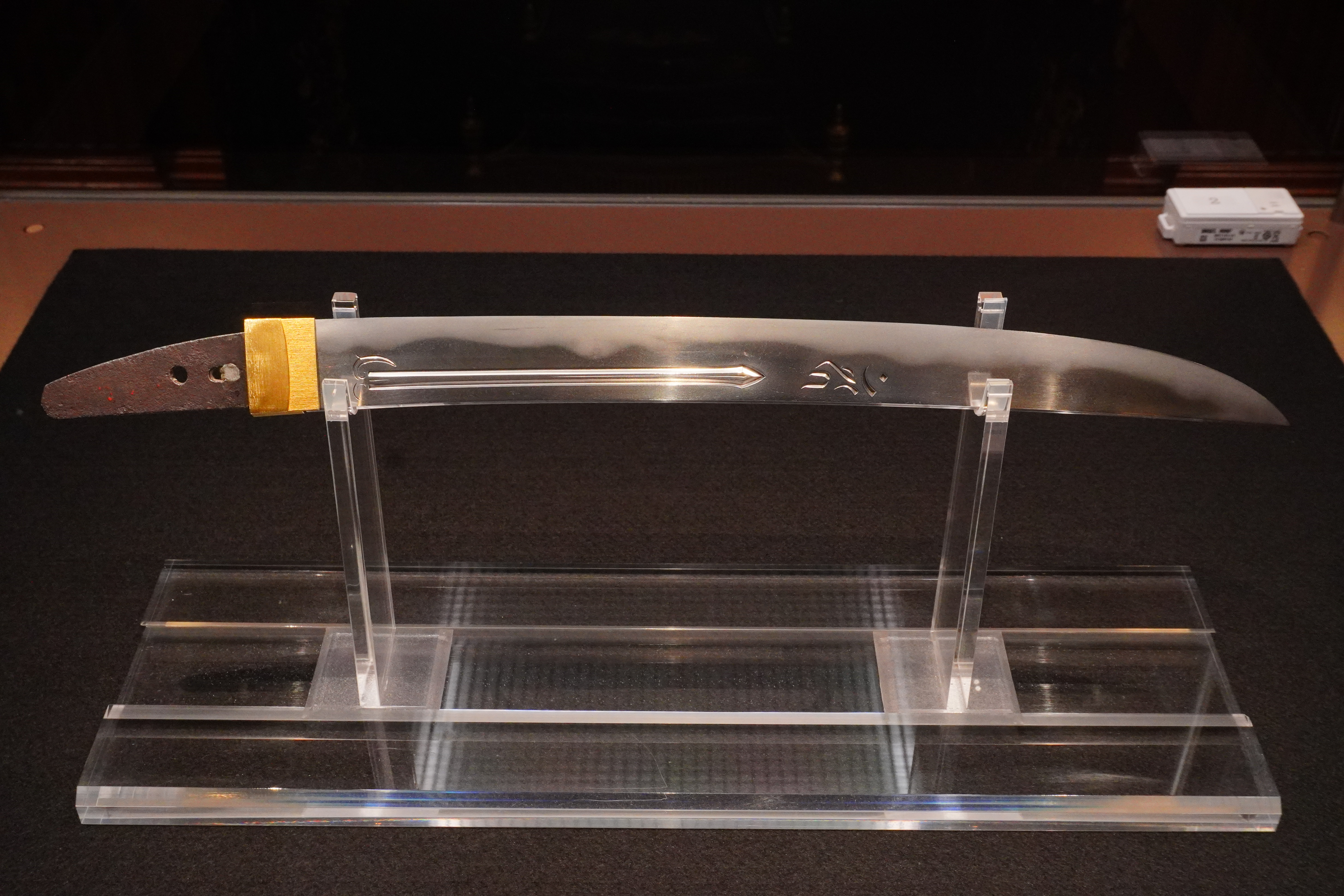
Tantō Tokuzenin Sadamune, National Treasure

== Publications ==
The museum has published a number of books in Japanese about its collection and exhibitions, including the following:

- Noh Masks: Handed Down by the Former Kongō Family (2008)
- Maruyama Okyo: Revealing Painting’s Depths (2010)
- Aesthetic Perfection: The Higashiyama Gomotsu Collection Assembled by the Ashikaga Shoguns in the 14th to 15th Centuries (2014)
- Generations of Mitsui Family Treasures: Supplemental Volume (2015)
- The traditional performing arts of Japan (2016)
- Kōrai Chawan: Choson Dynasty bowls as seen through the eyes of Japanese tea aesthetics (2019)
- Masterpieces from the Mitsui Family Collections: Commemorating the Museum's 15th Anniversary (2020)
- Settai Style - From zero Chic to Tokyo Modern (2021)
- Magnificent Maki-e: Tales of urushi and gold over a thousand years (2022)
- Mitsui Takatoshi and Echigoya: Business and culture in 17th Century Japan (2023)
- The Bamiyan Giant Buddhas: Sun God and Maitreya Beliefs from Gandhara to Japan (2024)
- Chanoyu Aesthetics: Rikyū, Oribe and Enshū’s Tea Utensils (2024)
- Enkū’s Buddhist Sculptures at Senkōji and in the Hida region (2025)
- Maruyama Okyo: From Innovator to Great Master (2025)

== See also ==
- Mitsui family
