= List of important tangible folk cultural properties (occupation) =

This lists 102 important tangible folk cultural properties in the category "articles used in manufacture and occupation (生産、生業に用いられるもの)".

== Selection criteria ==
Important tangible folk cultural properties are designated based on the following designation criteria:

Categories

1. Necessities of life: clothes, accessories, eating and drinking tools, household furnishings and other residential items
2. Manufacture, livelihood: farming implements, fishing and hunting gear, artisan tools, spinning and weaving equipment, other items related to work
3. Traffic, transportation, communication: means of transport, boats, express messenger implements and other items related to barriers
4. Trade, commerce: calculation and measurement tools, signs, licenses, and other shop related items
5. Social life: gift exchange, implements for guards and judgements, boarding houses
6. Religious faith: ritual implements, implements for Buddhist mass, votive offerings, idols, magic implements, and other items associated with shrines
7. Knowledge of folk customs: calendars, implements for fortune telling, medical tools, and other items related to institutional education
8. Folk entertainment, amusement, games: costumes, implements, musical instruments, masks, dolls, toys, and other items related to the stage
9. Related to the life of people: upbringing, important celebrations in family relationships, maternity rooms
10. Annual functions or events: implements for the Japanese New Year, seasonal festivals or the Bon Festival

Criteria

Materials from any of the above categories are then judged based on whether they exemplify:

1. historical change
2. a characteristic typical for the period
3. a regional characteristic
4. a characteristic of the level of life
5. a functional aspect

== Designated cultural properties ==
Name	Criteria	Location
Rumoi Pacific herring fishing (Former Saga Family Fishery) implements (留萌のニシン漁撈(旧佐賀家漁場)用具, rumoi no nishin gyorō (kyū sagake gyoba) yōgu)	1.2, 2.3	Rumoi, Hokkaidō
Beach hut and fishing implements from Hachinohe and surrounding area (八戸及び周辺地域の漁撈用具と浜小屋, hachinohe oyobi shūhen chiiki no gyorō yōgu to hamagoya)	1.2, 2.3	Hachinohe City Museum (八戸市博物館), Hachinohe, Aomori
Matagi hunting equipment (マタギの狩猟用具, matagi no shuryō yōgu)	1.2, 2.3, 2.5	Hekishō-ji Temple Museum (碧祥寺博物館), Nishiwaga, Iwate
Rikuzentakata fishing implements (陸前高田の漁撈用具, rikuzentakata no gyorō yōgu)	1.2	Rikuzentakata City Museum (陸前高田市立博物館), Rikuzentakata, Iwate
Manufactured goods and implements for sap collection and lacquer coating of Jōhōji (浄法寺の漆掻きと浄法寺塗の用具及び製品, jōhōji no urushikaki to jōhōji nuri no yōgu oyobi seihin)	1.2, 2.3, 2.5	Ninohe City Jōhō-ji Folk History Museum (二戸市立浄法寺歴史民俗資料館), Ninohe, Iwate
Nanbu Tōji sake brewing implements (南部杜氏の酒造用具, nanbu tōji no shuzō yōgu)	1.2, 2.3, 2.5	Ishidoriya Museum of History and Folklore (石鳥谷歴史民俗資料館), Ishidoriya, Hanamaki, Iwate
Collection of mountain village manufacturing tools from Kawai, Kitakami Sanchi (北上山地川井村の山村生産用具コレクション, kitakami sanchi kawai mura sanson seiisan yōgu korekushon)	1.2, 2.1, 2.3	Miyako Kitakamisanchi Museum of Folklore (宮古市北上山地民俗資料館), Miyako, Iwate
Ani-Matagi hunting equipment (阿仁マタギの狩猟用具, ani matagi no shuryō yōgu)	1.2, 2.3	Akita
Hachirōgata fishing implements (八郎潟漁撈用具, hachirō-gata gyorō yōgu)	1.2, 2.3	Katagami, Akita
Mogami River fishing implements (最上川水系の漁撈用具, mogamigawa suikei no gyorō yōgu)	1.2, 2.3	Chidō Museum, Tsuruoka, Yamagata
Shōnai rice cultivation tools (庄内の米作り用具, shōnai no komezukuri yōgu)	1.2, 2.3	Tsuruoka, Yamagata
Shōnai-hama and Tobishima fishing tools (庄内浜及び飛島の漁撈用具, shōnai-hama oyobi tobishima no gyorō yōgu)	1.2, 2.3	Chidō Museum, Tsuruoka, Yamagata
Okuaizu mountain village manufacturing tools and minka ("Umayado") (奥会津の山村生産用具及び民家(馬宿), okuaizu no sanson seisan yōgu oyobi minka (umayado))	1.2, 2.3, 2.5	Okuaizu Museum (奥会津博物館), Minamiaizu, Fukushima
Aizu Ramie production tools and manufactured goods (会津のからむし生産用具及び製品, aizu no karamushi seisan yōgu oyobi seihin)	1.2, 2.3	Karamushi Industrial Arts Museum (からむし工芸博物館), Shōwa, Fukushima
Aizu wax making tools and hut (Rōkamaya) (会津の製蝋用具及び蝋釜屋, aizu no seirō yōgu oyobi rōkamaya)	1.2, 2.3, 2.5	Aizu Folk Museum (会津民俗館), Inawashiro, Fukushima
Collection of manufacturing implements and work clothes from Aizu Tadami (会津只見の生産用具と仕事着コレクション, aizu tadami no seisan yōgu to shigotogi korekushon)	1.2, 1.1, 2.3	Asahi District Center (朝日地区センター), Tadami, Fukushima
Date region silkworm egg cards and implements related to sericulture and spinning (伊達の蚕種製造及び養蚕・製糸関連用具, date no sanshu seizō oyobi yōsan seishi kannen yōgu)	1.2, 2.3	Hobara Museum of History and Culture (保原歴史文化資料館), Date, Fukushima
Sano Tenmei casting manufacturing tools and goods (佐野の天明鋳物生産用具及び製品)		Sano, Tochigi, Tochigi
Yashū hemp manufacturing tools (野州麻の生産用具, yashū asa no seisan yōgu)	1.2, 2.3	Tochigi Prefectural Museum, Utsunomiya, Tochigi
Gyōda tabi manufacturing tools and related materials (行田の足袋製造用具及び関係資料, gyōda no tabi seizō yōgu oyobi kankei shiryō)	1.2, 2.3	Gyōda Municipal Folk Museum (行田市郷土博物館), Gyōda, Saitama
Arakawa River fishing implements (荒川水系の漁撈用具, arakawa suikei no gyorō yōgu)	1.2, 2.3	Minano, Saitama
ageo no tsumita hatasaku yōgu (上尾の摘田・畑作用具)	1.2, 2.3	Ageo, Saitama
Chichibu mountain village manufacturing tools (秩父の山村生産用具, chichibu no sanson seisan yōgu)	1.2, 2.3	Minano, Saitama
Higashichichibu manufacturing tools and goods for handmade washi paper (東秩父及び周辺地域の手漉和紙の製作用具及び製品, higashichichibu oyobi shūhen chiiki no tesuki washi no seisaku yōgu oyobi seihin)	1.2, 2.3, 2.5	Higashichichibu, Saitama
Kita-Musashi farming tools (北武蔵の農具, kitamusashi no nōgu)	1.2, 2.3	Saitama Prefectural Museum of History and Folklore, Saitama, Saitama
Kazusabori tools (上総掘りの用具, kazusabori no yōgu)	1.2, 1.1, 2.4	Kisarazu City Folk Museum Kin no Suzu (木更津市郷土資料館金のすず), Kisarazu, Chiba
Bōsō Peninsula fishing implements (房総半島の漁撈用具, bōsō hantō no gyorō yōgu)	1.2, 2.3	Tateyama Municipal Branch Museum (館山市立博物館分館), Tateyama, Chiba
Ogōchi mountain village implements of daily life (小河内の山村生活用具, ogōchi no sanson seikatsu yōgu)	1.1, 1.2, 2.3	Mizu to Midori no Fureaikan (奥多摩水と緑のふれあい館), Okutama, Tokyo
Ōmori and environs nori production tools (大森及び周辺地域の海苔生産用具, ōmori oyobi shūhen chiiki no nori seisan yōgu)	1.2, 2.3	Omori Nori Museum (大森海苔のふるさと館), Ōta, Tokyo
Miura Peninsula fishing implements (三浦半島の漁撈用具, miura hantō no gyorō yōgu)	1.2, 2.3	Yokosuka City Museum (横須賀市自然・人文博物館), Yokosuka, Kanagawa
Echigo Oku-miomote mountain village production tools (越後奥三面の山村生産用具, echigo oku-miomote no sanson seisan yōgu)	1.2, 2.3	The Dawn of Jōmon Settlement: Okumiomote Historical Interactive Museum (縄文の里・朝日 奥三面歴史交流館, Jōmon no Sato – Asahi: Okumiomote Rekishi Kōryūkan), Yokosuka, Niigata
Echigo chijimi weaving implements and related materials (越後縮の紡織用具及び関連資料, echigo chijimi no hōshoku yōgu oyobi kanren shiryō)	1.1, 1.2, 2.3	Tōkamachi City Museum (十日町市博物館), Tōkamachi, Niigata
Sado Kaifu weaving implements and manufactured goods (佐渡海府の紡織用具及び製品, sado kaifu hōshoku yōgu oyobi seihin)	1.1, 1.2, 2.3	Aikawa Folk Museum (相川郷土博物館), Sado, Niigata
Collection of Itoigawa Kijiya manufacturing tools, goods and related documents (糸魚川木地屋の製作用具と製品コレクション 附木地屋関係文書, itoigawa kijiya no seisaku yōgu to seihin korekushon tsuketari kijiya kankei monjo)	1.2, 2.3	Kijiya Folk Museum (木地屋民俗資料館), Itoigawa, Niigata
Akiyamagō and environs mountain village production tools (秋山郷及び周辺地域の山村生産用具, akiyamagō oyobi shūhen chiiki no sanson seisan yōgu)	1.2, 2.3, 2.5	Tsunan Museum of History and Folklore (津南町歴史民俗資料館), Tsunan, Niigata
Shipwright tools and boats, yamadashi tools, model boats, boat ema (船大工用具及び磯舟 附 山出し用具 模型和船 船形絵馬, funadaiku yōgu oyobi isobune tsuketari yamadashi yōgu mokei wasen funagataema)	1.2, 2.5	Sado-koku Ogi Folk Culture Museum (佐渡国小木民俗博物館), Sado, Niigata
Minamisado fishing implements (南佐渡の漁撈用具, minami sado no gyorō yōgu)	1.2, 2.3	Sado-koku Ogi Folk Culture Museum (佐渡国小木民俗博物館), Sado, Niigata
Kitasado (Kaifu, Ryōtsu Bay, Lake Kamo) fishing implements (北佐渡（海府・両津湾・加茂湖）の漁撈用具, kitasado (kaifu, ryōtsuwan, kamoko) no gyorō yōgu)	1.2, 2.3	Ryōtsu Folk Museum (両津郷土博物館), Sado, Niigata
Tonami implements of daily life and manufacturing tools (砺波の生活・生産用具, tonami no seikatsu seisan yōgu)	1.1, 1.2, 2.3	Tonami, Toyama
Manufacturing tools for Kaga handmade washi and minka (加賀の手漉和紙の製作用具及び民家, kaga no tesuki washi no seisaku yōgu oyobi minka)	1.2, 2.3, 2.5	Kanazawa, Ishikawa
Manufacturing tools for Kaga Zōgan inlay (加賀象嵌製作用具, kaga zōgan seisaku yōgu)	1.2, 2.3, 2.5	Kanazawa, Ishikawa
Manufacturing tools for Kanazawa gold leaf (金沢の金箔製作用具, kanazawa no kinpaku seisaku yōgu)	1.2, 2.5	Kanazawa, Ishikawa
Implements of Noto lacquer tappers and tools for Noto-Kaga lacquer work (能登の漆掻きおよび加賀・能登の漆工用具, noto no urushi-kaki oyobi kaga noto no shikkō yōgu)	1.2, 2.3, 2.5	(珠洲市能登記念館), Suzu, Ishikawa
Noto Agehama style salt-making implements (能登の揚浜製塩用具, noto no agehama seien yōgu)	1.2, 2.3, 2.5	(珠洲市能登記念館), Suzu, Ishikawa
Hakusanroku mountain village production tools and minka (白山麓の山村生産用具及び民家, hakusan roku no sanson seisan yōgu oyobi minka)	1.2, 2.3, 2.5	Kaga, Ishikawa
Hokuriku region wood grain production tools (北陸地方の木地製作用具, hokuriku chihō no kiji seisaku yōgu)	1.2, 2.3, 2.5	Kanazawa, Ishikawa
Wajima-nuri lacquer manufacturing tools and goods (輪島塗の製作用具及び製品, wajima-nuri no seisaku yōgu oyobi seihin)	1.2, 1.3, 2.5	Wajima Lacquer Hall (輪島漆器会館), Wajima, Ishikawa
Echizen Washi manufacturing tools and goods (越前和紙の製作用具及び製品, echizen washi no seisaku yōgu oyobbi seihin)	1.2, 1.3, 2.5	Washi and Culture Museum (紙の文化博物館), Echizen, Fukui
Kōshū Nishiyama slash-and-burn farming tools (甲州西山の焼畑農耕用具, kōshū nishiyama no yakihata nōkō yōgu)	1.2, 1.3	Hayakawa Folk History Museum (早川町歴史民俗資料館), Hayakawa, Yamanashi
yoshidaguchi fujisan shinkō yōgu (吉田口の富士山信仰用具)		Yoshida, Yamanashi
Collection of farming tools (農耕用具コレクション, nōkō yōgu korekushon)	1.2, 1.3	Matsumoto City Museum of Art (松本市立博物館), Matsumoto, Nagano
Kiso-nuri lacquer manufacturing tools and goods (木曽塗の製作用具及び製品, kiso nuri no seisaku yōgu oyobi seihin)	1.2, 1.3, 2.5	Kiso Shikki-kan (木曽漆器館), Shiojiri, Nagano
Shōkawa sericulture tools (荘川の養蚕用具, shōkawa no yōsan yōgu)	1.2, 2.2, 2.3	Hida Minzoku Mura Folk Village, Takayama, Gifu
Implements for cormorant fishing on the Nagara River (長良川鵜飼用具, nagaragawa ukai yōgu)	1.2, 2.4	Gifu City Museum of History, Gifu, Gifu
Tokuyama mountain village manufacturing tools (徳山の山村生産用具, tokuyama no sanson seisan yōgu)	1.2, 2.3, 2.5	tokuyama minzoku shiryō shūzōko (徳山民俗資料収蔵庫), Ibigawa, Gifu
Hida lumbering and woodworking tools (飛騨の山樵及び木工用具, hida no sanshō oyobi mokkō yōgu)	1.2, 2.3, 2.5	hida no sanshō-kan (飛騨の山樵館), Hida, Gifu
Hida mountain village manufacturing tools (飛騨の山村生産用具, hida no sanson seisan yōgu)	1.2, 2.3, 2.5	Hida Minzoku Mura Folk Village, Takayama, Gifu
Myōgata mountain village manufacturing tools (明方の山村生産用具, myōgata no sanson seisan yōgu)	1.2, 2.3, 2.5	Meihō History and Folk Museum (明宝歴史民俗資料館), Gujō, Gifu
Fishing implements from Numazu Uchiura and Shizuura (沼津内浦・静浦及び周辺地域の漁撈用具, numazu uchiura shizuura oyobi shūhen chiiki no gyorō yōgu)	1.2, 2.3	Numazu City History and Folk Museum (沼津市歴史民俗資料館), Numazu, Shizuoka
Tokoname pottery manufacturing tools, goods and climbing kiln (常滑の陶器の生産用具・製品及び登窯, tokoname no tōji no seisan yōgu seihin oyobi noborigama)	1.2, 2.3, 2.5	Tokoname City Folk Museum (常滑市民俗資料館), Tokoname, Aichi
Seto pottery manufacturing tools and goods (瀬戸の陶磁器の生産用具及び製品, seto no tōjiki no seisan yōgu oyobi seihin)	1.2, 2.3, 2.5	Seto City Folk History Museum (瀬戸市歴史民俗資料館), Seto, Aichi
Chita Peninsula fishing tools and related accounting book (知多半島の漁撈用具 附 漁撈関係帳面類, chita hantō no gyorō yōgu tsuketari gyorō kankei chōmenrui)	1.2, 2.3	Chita City Folk History Museum (知多市歴史民俗博物館), Seto, Aichi
Tsugu logging tools and processed goods (津具の山樵用具および加工品, tsugu no sanshō yōgu oyobi kakōhin)	1.2, 2.3, 2.5	Tsugu Folk Museum (津具民俗資料館), Shitara, Aichi
Handa vinegar brewing tools (半田の酢醸造用具, handa no sujōzō yōgu)	1.2, 2.3, 2.4	Handa Municipal Museum (半田市立博物館), Handa, Aichi
Ise Bay, Shima Peninsula and Kumano Sea fishing tools (伊勢湾・志摩半島・熊野灘の漁撈用具, isewan shimahantō kumano nada no gyorō yōgu)	1.2, 2.3	Toba Sea-Folk Museum, Toba, Mie
Manufacturing tools of Shima Peninsula and related materials (志摩半島の生産用具及び関連資料, shima hantō no seisan yōgu oyobi kanren shiryō)	2.1, 2.2, 2.3, 2.4, 2.5	Shima City Museum of History and Folklore, Shima, Mie
Ōmi Kōka rip saw tools and goods (近江甲賀の前挽鋸製造用具及び製品, ōmikōka no maebikinoko seizō yōgu oyobi seihin)	1.2, 2.4, 2.6	Konan Fureai no Kan (海の博物館), Koka, Shiga
Tango spinning and weaving tools and goods (丹後の紡織用具及び製品, tango no hōshoku yōgu oyobi seihin)	1.1, 1.2, 2.3	tango kyōdo shiryōkan (京都府立丹後郷土資料館), Miyazu, Kyoto
Akō salt making tools (赤穂の製塩用具, akō no seien yōgu)	1.2	Akō City Museum of History (赤穂市立歴史博物館), Akō, Hyōgo
Nada sake brewing tools (灘の酒造用具, nada no shuzō yōgu)	1.2, 2.3, 2.5	Kiku Masamune Shuzō Kinenkan (菊正宗酒造記念館), Kobe, Hyōgo
Yoshino forestry implements and manufacturing tools for forestry products (吉野林業用具と林産加工用具, yoshino ringyō yōgu to rinsan kakō yōgu)	1.2, 2.3	Nara Prefectural Museum of Folklore, Yamatokōriyama, Nara
Mountain village manufacturing tools from the Totsukawa area (十津川郷の山村生産用具, totsukawagō no sanson seisan yōgu)	1.2, 2.3, 2.5	Totsukawa, Nara
Kurayoshi metal casting tools and products (倉吉の鋳物師（斎江家）用具及び製品, kurayoshi no imoji (saigōke) yōgu oyobi seihin)	1.2, 2.3, 2.5	Kurayoshi Museum of History and Folklore (倉吉歴史民俗資料館), Kurayoshi, Tottori
Tatara iron manufacturing tools (たたら製鉄用具, tatara seitetsu yōgu)	1.2, 2.3	Wako Museum (和鋼博物館), Yasugi, Shimane
Oki Islands manufacturing tools (隠岐島後の生産用具, okidōgo no seisan yōgu)	1.2, 2.3	Oki Kyōdokan (隠岐郷土館), Okinoshima, Shimane
Sugaya Tatara iron town (菅谷たたら山内, sugaya tatara sannai)	1.2, 2.3, 2.5	Unnan, Shimane
Mountain village manufacturing tools from Higashihida (東比田の山村生産用具, higashi hida no sanson seisan yōgu)	1.2, 2.3	(広瀬重要民俗資料収蔵庫), Yasugi, Shimane
Mountain village manufacturing tools from Haza (波佐の山村生産用具, haza no sanson seisan yōgu)	1.2, 2.3, 2.5	hamada-shi kinjō minzoku shiryōkan (浜田市金城民俗資料館), Hamada, Shimane
Collection of dyeing tools and plant dye products of Geihoku (芸北の染織用具および草木染めコレクション, geihoku no senshoku yōgu oyobi kusakizome korekushon)	1.1, 1.2, 2.3	Museum of Geihoku Folk Performing Arts and Folklore (芸北民俗収蔵庫), Kitahiroshima, Hiroshima
Gōnokawa River basin fishing implements and documents related to fishing grounds (江の川流域の漁撈用具 附漁場関係資料, gōnokawa ryūiki no gyorō yōgu tsuketari gyoba kankei shiryō)	1.2, 2.3	Hiroshima Prefectural Museum of History and Folklore (広島県立歴史民俗資料館), Miyoshi, Hiroshima
Kawahigashi implements for the Hayashida rice planting event (川東のはやし田用具, kawahigashi no hayashida yōgu)	1.2, 2.3, 2.5	Kitahiroshima, Hiroshima
Various tools from Kuka (久賀の諸職用具, kuka no shoshoku yōgu)	1.2, 2.3, 2.5	Kuka Folk History Museum (久賀歴史民俗資料館), Suō-Ōshima, Yamaguchi
East Suō-Ōshima production tools (周防大島東部の生産用具, suō-ōshima tōbu no seisan yōgu)	1.2, 2.3	Suō-Ōshima, Yamaguchi
Salt making tools (製塩用具, seien yōgu)	1.2	Hōfu, Yamaguchi
Nagato whaling implements (長門の捕鯨用具, nagato no hogei yōgu)	1.2, 2.3	Whale Museum (くじら資料館), Nagato, Yamaguchi
Awa wasanbon manufacturing implements (阿波の和三盆製造用具, awa no wasanbon seizō yōgu)	1.2, 2.3, 2.5	Matsushige, Tokushima
Awa doll maker (Tenguya) manufacturing tools and goods, materials related to selling (阿波人形師（天狗屋）の製作用具及び製品 附 販売関係資料, awa ningyōshi (tenguya) no seisaku yōgu oyobi seihin tsuketari hanbai kankei shiryō)	1.2, 1.8	Tokushima Tengu Hisa Museum (徳島市天狗久資料館), Tokushima, Tokushima
Awa indigo cultivation and processing tools (阿波藍栽培加工用具, awa aisaibai kakō yōgu)	1.2, 2.3, 2.4	Aizumi Historical Museum Ai-no-Yakata (藍住町歴史館藍の館), Aizumi, Tokushima
Naruto salt making tools (鳴門の製塩用具, naruto no seien yōgu)	1.2, 2.3	Tokushima Prefectural Museum, Tokushima, Tokushima
Sanuki and surrounding area sugar cane processing tools and facilities (讃岐及び周辺地域の砂糖製造用具と砂糖しめ小屋・釜屋, sanuki oyobi shūhen chiiki no satō seizō yōgu to satō shimekoya kamaya)	1.2, 2.3, 2.5	Shikoku Mura, Takamatsu, Kagawa
Sanuki and surrounding area soy sauce brewing implements and facilities (讃岐及び周辺地域の醤油醸造用具と醤油蔵・麹室, sanuki oyobi shūhen chiiki no shōyu jōzō yōgu to shōyugura kōjimuro)	1.2, 2.3, 2.5	Shikoku Mura, Takamatsu, Kagawa
Seto Inland Sea boat drawings and shipwright tools (瀬戸内海の船図及び船大工用具, seto naikai no funazu oyobi funadaiku yōgu)	1.2, 2.3, 2.5	Seto Inland Sea Folk History Museum (瀬戸内海歴史民俗資料館), Takamatsu, Kagawa
Seto Inland Sea and surrounding area fishing tools (瀬戸内海及び周辺地域の漁撈用具, seto naikai oyobi shūhen chiiki no gyorō yōgu)	1.2, 2.3	Seto Inland Sea Folk History Museum (瀬戸内海歴史民俗資料館), Takamatsu, Kagawa
Mure, Kagawa and Aji stonemason tools (牟礼・庵治の石工用具, mure aji no ishiku yōgu)	1.2, 2.5	Stone Museum (高松市石の民俗資料館), Takamatsu, Kagawa
Uchiko and surrounding area wax making tools (内子及び周辺地域の製蝋用具, uchiko oyobi shūhen chiiki no seirō yōgu)	1.2, 2.3, 2.5	Japanese Wax Museum, Kamihaga Residence (木蝋資料館上芳我邸), Uchiko, Ehime
Tosa Toyonaga and surrounding area mountain village manufacturing tools (土佐豊永郷及び周辺地域の山村生産用具, tosa toyonagagō oyobi shūhen chiiki no sanson seisan yōgu)	1.2	Ōtoyo, Kōchi
Hizen Saga sake brewing tools (肥前佐賀の酒造用具, hizen saga no shuzō yōgu)	1.2, 2.3, 2.5	Taiheian Distillery Museum (大平庵酒蔵資料館), Taku, Saga
Ariake Sea fishing implements (有明海漁撈用具, ariake-kai gyorō yōgu)	1.2, 2.3	Saga Prefectural Museum, Saga, Saga
Kamae fishing implements (蒲江の漁撈用具, kamae no gyorō yōgu)	1.2, 2.3	Saiki Kamae Sea Museum (佐伯市蒲江海の資料館), Saiki, Ōita
Nishimera slash-and-burn farming tools (西米良の焼畑農耕用具, nishimera no yakihata nōkō yōgu)	1.2, 2.3	Nishimera Museum of History and Folklore (西米良村歴史民俗資料館), Nishimera, Miyazaki
Higashimera hunting implements (東米良の狩猟用具, higashimera no shuryō yōgu)	1.2, 2.3	Saito Museum of the History of Folk Customs (西都市歴史民俗資料館), Saito, Miyazaki
Hyūga mountain village manufacturing tools (日向の山村生産用具, hyūga no sanson seisan yōgu)	1.2, 1.3, 2.3	Miyazaki Prefectural Museum of Nature and History, Miyazaki, Miyazaki
