= List of cultural properties of Japan – historical materials (Osaka) =

This list is of the cultural properties of Japan designated in the category of historical materials (歴史資料, rekishi shiryō) for the Urban Prefecture of Ōsaka.

== National Cultural Properties ==
As of 1 February 2015, one Important Cultural Property has been designated, being of national significance.

Property	Date	Municipality	Ownership	Comments	Image	Coordinates	Ref.
Materials relating to the Nakai Family of Head Carpenters 大工頭中井家関係資料 daiku-gashira Nakai-ke kankei shiryō	Edo period	Osaka	kept at The Osaka Museum of Housing and Living (大阪市立住まいのミュージアム)	5,195 items		34°42′37″N 135°30′42″E	

== Prefectural Cultural Properties ==
As of 1 May 2014, five properties have been designated at a prefectural level.

Property	Date	Municipality	Ownership	Comments	Image	Coordinates	Ref.
Kimura Kenkadō's Shellfish Fossil Specimens 木村蒹葭堂 貝石標本; Kimura Kenkadō kaiseki hyōhon	Edo period	Osaka	Osaka City (kept at Osaka Museum of Natural History (大阪市立自然史博物館))			34°36′37″N 135°31′21″E	
Osaka Prefectural Numismatic Collection 府立大阪博物場旧蔵 古銭貨章牌類資料 附 古銭貨章牌類目録 furitsu Ōsaka hakubutsu-ba kyūzō ko senka fumi pairui shiryō tsuketari ko senka fumi pairui mokuroku	Ancient to Modern	Osaka	Osaka Prefecture (kept at Osaka Prefectural Office for the Investigation of Cultural Properties (大阪府文化財調査事務所))	includes coins and catalogues		34°29′34″N 135°30′04″E	
Iwahashi Zenbei's Astronomical Instruments 岩橋善兵衛天文観測器具及び平天儀等; Iwahashi Zenbei tenmon kansoku kigu oyobi heitengi-tō	Edo period	Kaizuka	Kaizuka City (kept at Zenbei Land (貝塚市立善兵衛ランド))			34°24′22″N 135°23′18″E	
Silver Seal 銀印 印文「晋率善羌中郎将」 gin shirushi	Jin	Kanan	Osaka Prefecture (kept at Osaka Prefectural Chikatsu Asuka Museum)			34°30′11″N 135°38′38″E	
Christian Tombstone of Tawara Reiman Excavated from Senkōji Site 千光寺跡出土田原礼幡キリシタン墓碑; Senkōji ato shutsudo Tawara Reiman kirishitan bohi	1581	Shijōnawate	Shijōnawate City Board of Education (kept at Shijōnawate Museum of History and Folklore (四條畷市歴史民俗資料館))	beneath a christogram with a cross, the three column inscription reads: "Tenshō 9, metal snake" (天正九年辛巳), "Reiman" (礼幡), "eighth month, seventh day" (八月七日); Senkōji was the family temple of the lords of Tawara Castle (田原城) and Tawara Reiman features in one of Luís Fróis' letters		34°36′37″N 135°31′21″E	

== See also ==
- Cultural Properties of Japan
- List of National Treasures of Japan (historical materials)
- List of Historic Sites of Japan (Ōsaka)
- Kawachi, Izumi, and Settsu Provinces
