= Takanabe Museum of Art =

Museum in Nikkō, Tochigi, Japan

- 高鍋町美術館
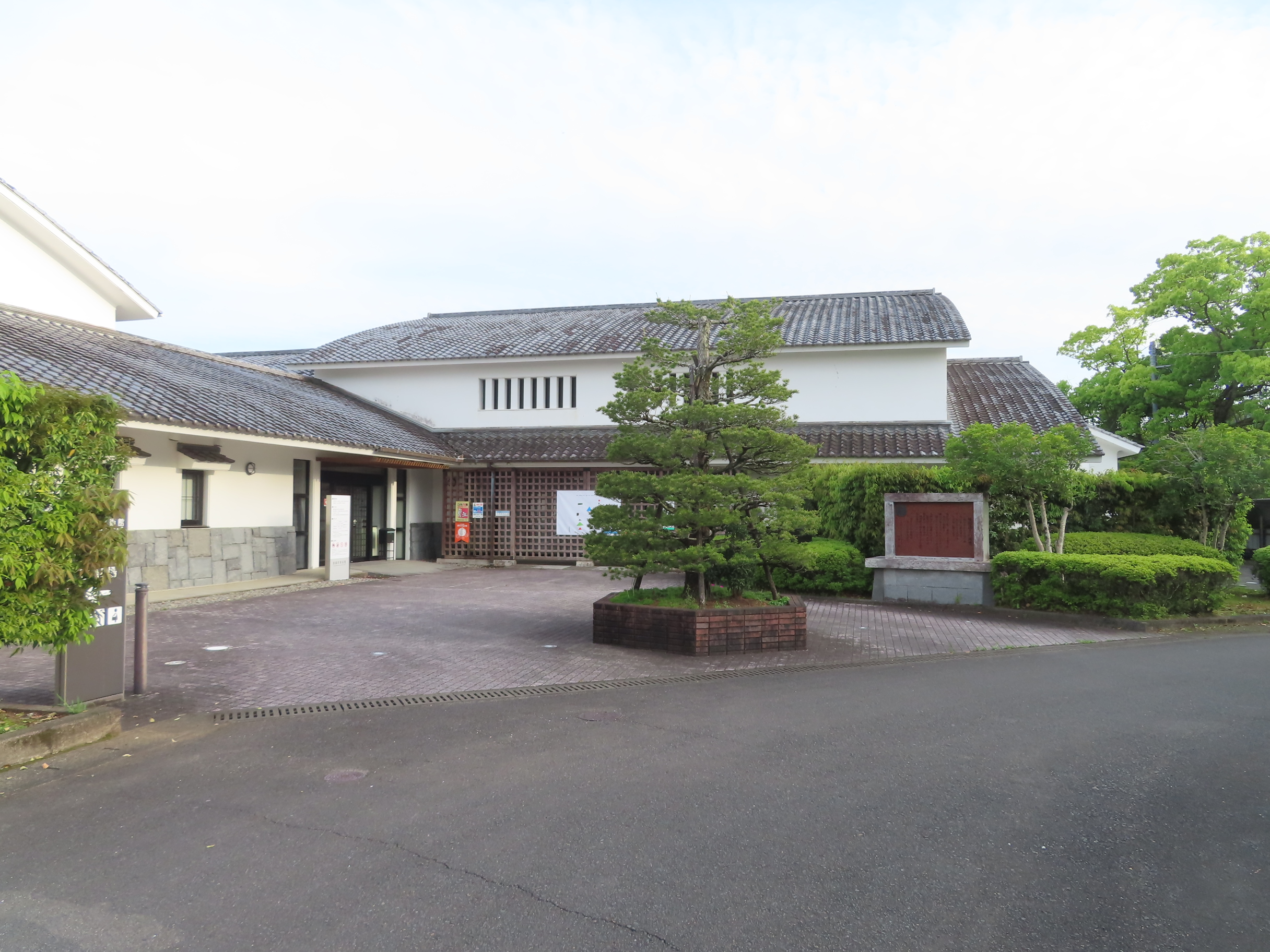
- Interactive map of the Takanabe Museum of Art area

General information
- Location: 6916-1 Minami-Takanabe, Takanabe, Miyazaki Prefecture, Japan
- Coordinates: 32°07′15″N 131°30′14″E
- Opened: 3 November 1999

Website
- Official website (in Japanese)

Takanabe Museum of Art (高鍋町美術館, Takanabe-chō Bijutsukan) opened in Takanabe, Miyazaki Prefecture, Japan in 1999. Located inside the moat of Takanabe Castle, the museum's collection comprises some eight hundred artworks, including paintings by Kojima Torajirō, and temporary exhibitions are also mounted.

== See also ==
- Miyazaki Prefectural Art Museum
- Mochida Kofun Cluster
