= Utsunomiya Museum of Art =

- 宇都宮美術館
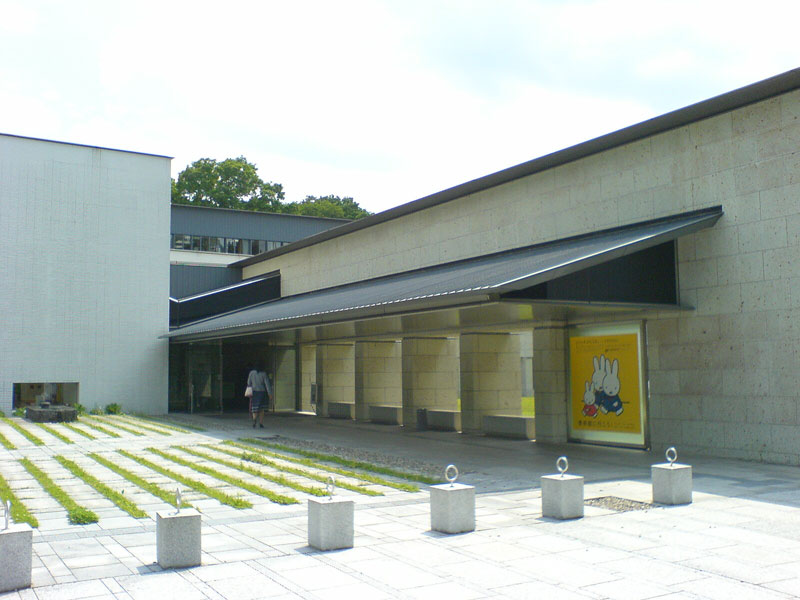
- Interactive map of the Utsunomiya Museum of Art area

General information
- Location: 1077 Nagaoka-chō, Utsunomiya, Tochigi Prefecture, Japan
- Coordinates: 36°36′25″N 139°52′26″E
- Opened: 23 March 1997

Website
- Official website

Utsunomiya Museum of Art (宇都宮美術館, Utsunomiya Bijutsukan) opened in a wooded area some 5 kilometres (3.1 mi) north of the centre of Utsunomiya, Tochigi Prefecture, Japan, in 1997. The collection includes works by Kuroda Seiki and Asai Chū, Paul Klee and Wassily Kandinsky, and special exhibitions are also held.

== See also ==
- Tochigi Prefectural Museum
- Tochigi Prefectural Museum of Fine Arts
