= Prefectural museum =

Type of Japanese museum

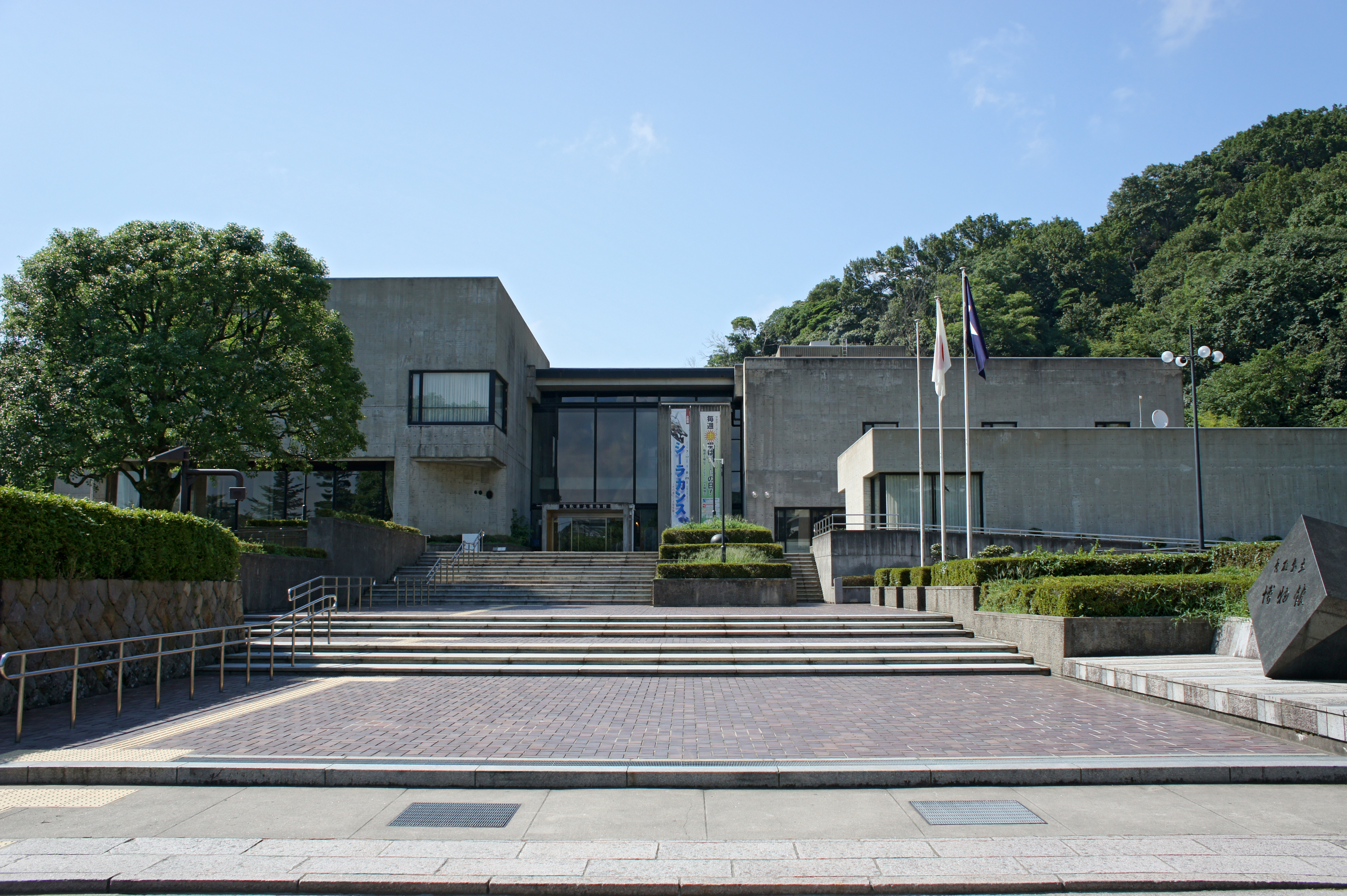
Tottori Prefectural Museum is a prefectural museum of Tottori Prefecture.

A prefectural museum is a museum that specializes in collections local to a prefecture of Japan.

Prefectural museums emerged in postwar Japan, and since these institutions are of recent origin their collections tend not to contain older Japan arts, with primarily Meiji era, 20th-century, and contemporary art. Most prefectural museums feature collections of arts, culture, and history with a strong emphasis on their native prefecture, but can exhibit works and collections from outside of the prefecture alongside the native collections, usually contemporary art from cultural centers such as Tokyo and exotic art from outside Japan. For example, the Nagasaki Prefectural Art Museum specializing in art related to the city of Nagasaki also houses a collection of paintings from Spain belonging to a Japanese collector.

Prefectural museums tend to be large and some are more distinguished for their own architecture than for the collections they hold. Noted architect Kunio Maekawa designed both the Kumamoto Prefectural Art Museum in Kumamoto as well as the Saitama Prefectural Museum at Ōmiya Ward, Saitama.

== List of prefectural museums ==
Examples of prefectural museums include:

- Aichi Prefectural Ceramic Museum
- Aomori Prefectural Museum
- Fukui Prefectural Dinosaur Museum
- Fukui Prefectural Museum of Cultural History
- Fukuoka Prefectural Museum of Art
- Fukushima Prefectural Museum of Art
- Hiroshima Prefectural Art Museum
- Hiroshima Prefectural Museum of History
- Hyōgo Prefectural Museum of Art
- Ibaraki Prefectural Museum of History
- Ishikawa Prefectural History Museum
- Ishikawa Prefectural Museum of Art
- Ishikawa Prefectural Museum of Traditional Arts and Crafts
- Kōchi Prefectural Museum of Art
- Kōchi Prefectural Museum of History
- Kumamoto Prefectural Ancient Burial Mound Museum
- Kumamoto Prefectural Museum of Art
- Miyazaki Prefectural Art Museum
- Miyazaki Prefectural Museum of Nature and History
- Ōita Prefectural Museum of History
- Okayama Prefectural Museum
- Okayama Prefectural Museum of Art
- Okinawa Prefectural Museum
- Osaka Prefectural Chikatsu Asuka Museum
- Reimeikan, Kagoshima Prefectural Center for Historical Material
- Saga Prefectural Museum
- Saga Prefectural Nagoya Castle Museum
- Saitama Prefectural Museum of the Sakitama Ancient Burial Mounds
- Tochigi Prefectural Museum
- Tochigi Prefectural Museum of Fine Arts
- Tokushima Prefectural Museum
- Tottori Prefectural Museum
- Wakayama Prefectural Museum
- Yamagata Prefectural Museum
- Yamaguchi Prefectural Museum
- Yamaguchi Prefectural Museum of Art

== See also ==
- Japanese museums
- List of museums in Japan
