= Miyazaki Prefectural Museum of Nature and History =

- 宮崎県総合博物館
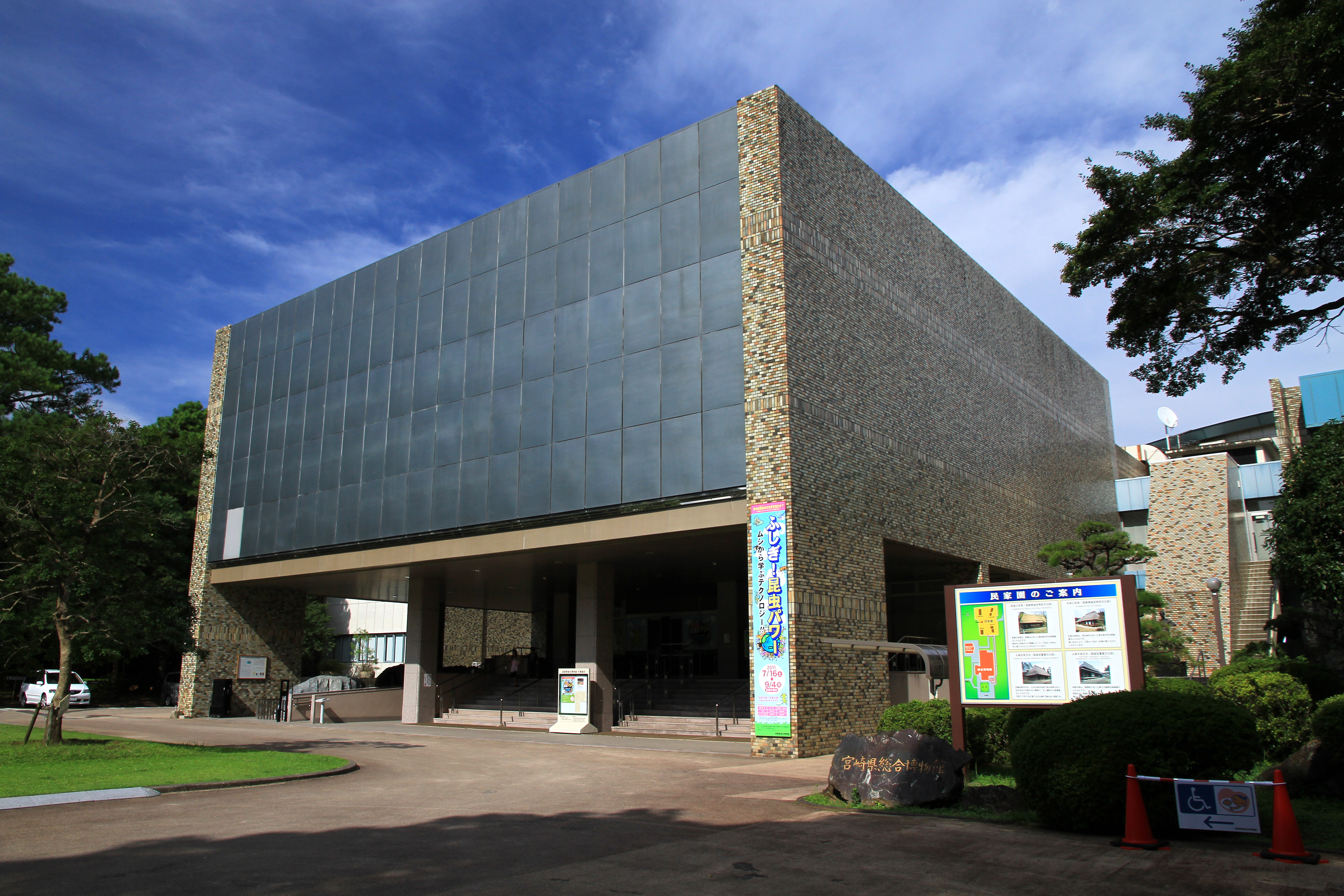
- Interactive map of the Miyazaki Prefectural Museum of Nature and History area

General information
- Location: 2-44 Jingū, Miyazaki, Miyazaki Prefecture, Japan
- Coordinates: 31°56′24″N 131°25′25″E
- Opened: 2 March 1971

Website
- homepage (jp)

Miyazaki Prefectural Museum of Nature and History (宮崎県総合博物館, Miyazaki-ken sōgō hakubutsukan) is a prefectural museum in Miyazaki, Japan, dedicated to the natural history and history of Miyazaki Prefecture. The museum opened in the grounds of Miyazaki Jingū in 1971.

== See also ==
- List of Historic Sites of Japan (Miyazaki)
- List of Important Tangible Folk Cultural Properties (occupation)
- Miyazaki Prefectural Art Museum
- Hyūga Province
