= Chidō Museum =

Open-air museum in Yamagata Prefecture, Japan

Chido Museum
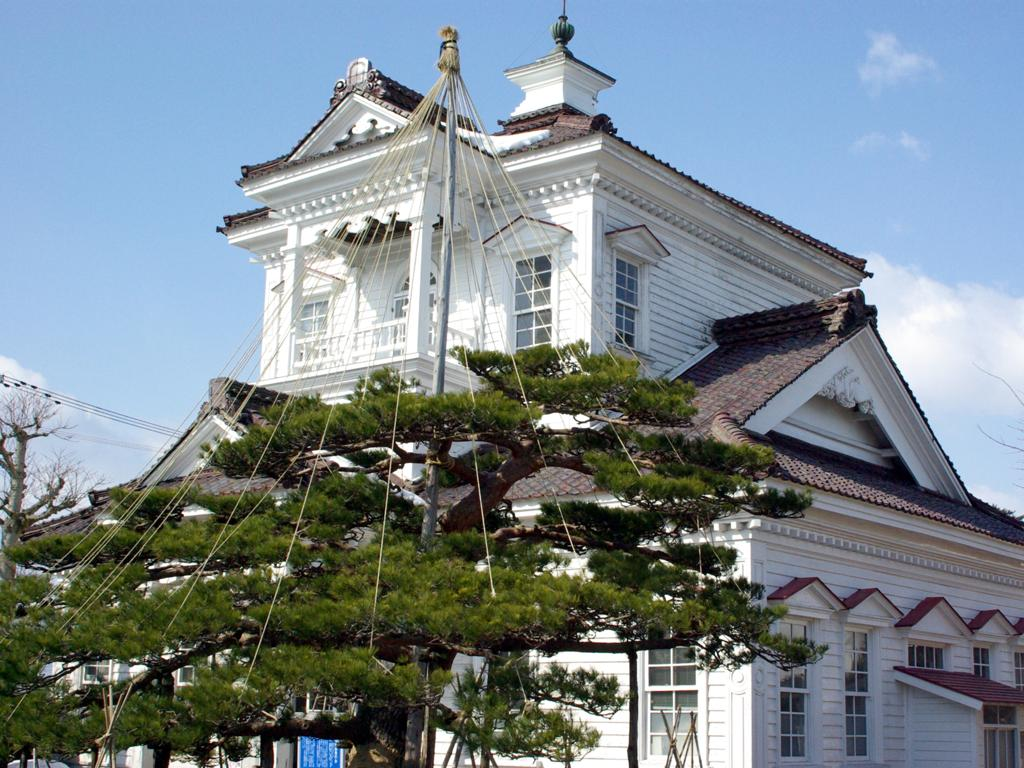
- Former Tsuruoka Police Station

- Location within Japan
- Established: 1950
- Location: 10-18 Kachushin-machi Tsuruoka Yamagata 997-0036 Japan
- Coordinates: 38.728347°N 139.821278°E
- Type: Open-air museum, Folk museum
- Public transit access: Tsuruoka Station
- Website: www.chido.jp

The Chido Museum (致道博物館, Chidō hakubutsukan) is a private museum in Tsuruoka, Yamagata Prefecture, Japan.

It was founded in 1950 by the former Lord Sakai of the Shōnai Domain who donated his properties with the intention of promoting local culture. The museum houses folk materials from Shōnai, classical calligraphy, woodcraft and ceremonial sake barrels.

In addition to the Goinden, retirement residence of the Sakai Lords built in 1863, the Lord's arsenal (Mingu no Kura), and the attached Japanese garden, designated as Place of Scenic Beauty, a number of buildings have been relocated and newly built at the museum site. Two Western style from the early Meiji period built by the prefectural governor Mishima Michitsune have been designated as Important Cultural Property: the Former Nishitagawa District Office from 1881, relocated in 1972; and the Former Tsuruoka Police Station from 1884, relocated in 1957. A large minka three-story farmhouse with thatched roof known as the Former Shibuya Family Home, built in 1822 in Tamugimata, Asahi village was relocated to the museum in 1965. In 1981 a new building, the National Important Folklore Cultural Assets Storage was established.

The museum houses a number of Cultural Properties of Japan: two National Treasure tachi, a painting Wang Zhaojun (Important Cultural Property) and seven Important Tangible Folk Cultural Properties: Mogami River fishing implements, Collection of transport implements used by porters along the Himekawa river valley of Echigo Province, Collection of Kurimono and related tools from Shōnai and surrounding areas, Shōnai collection of work clothes, Shōnai collection of wooden drinking vessels, Collection of Daihō-ji pottery and Collection of Bandori from Shōnai.

== Sakai clan gardens ==
Sakai clan Gardens
- 酒井氏庭園
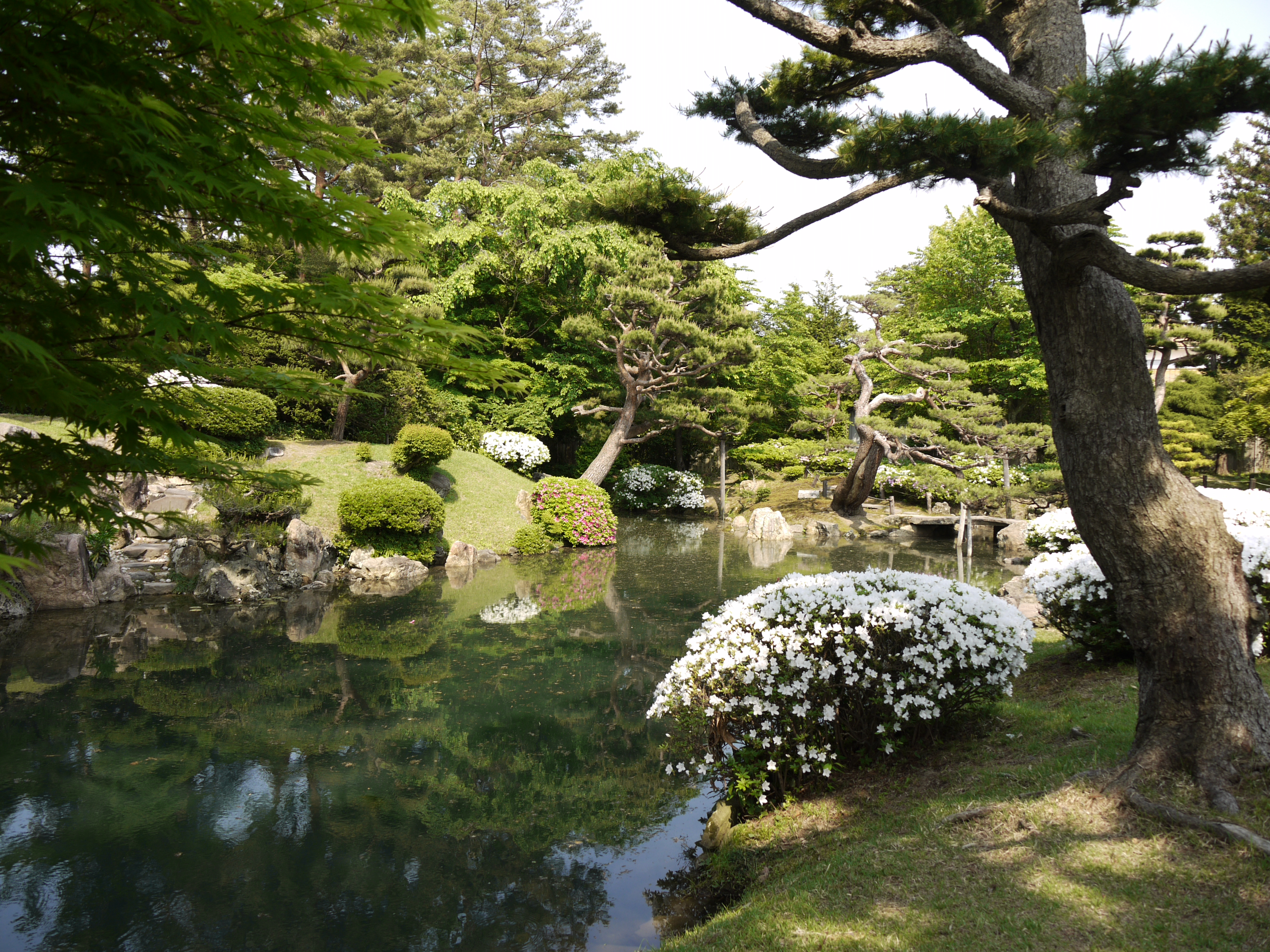
- Sakai clan Gardens

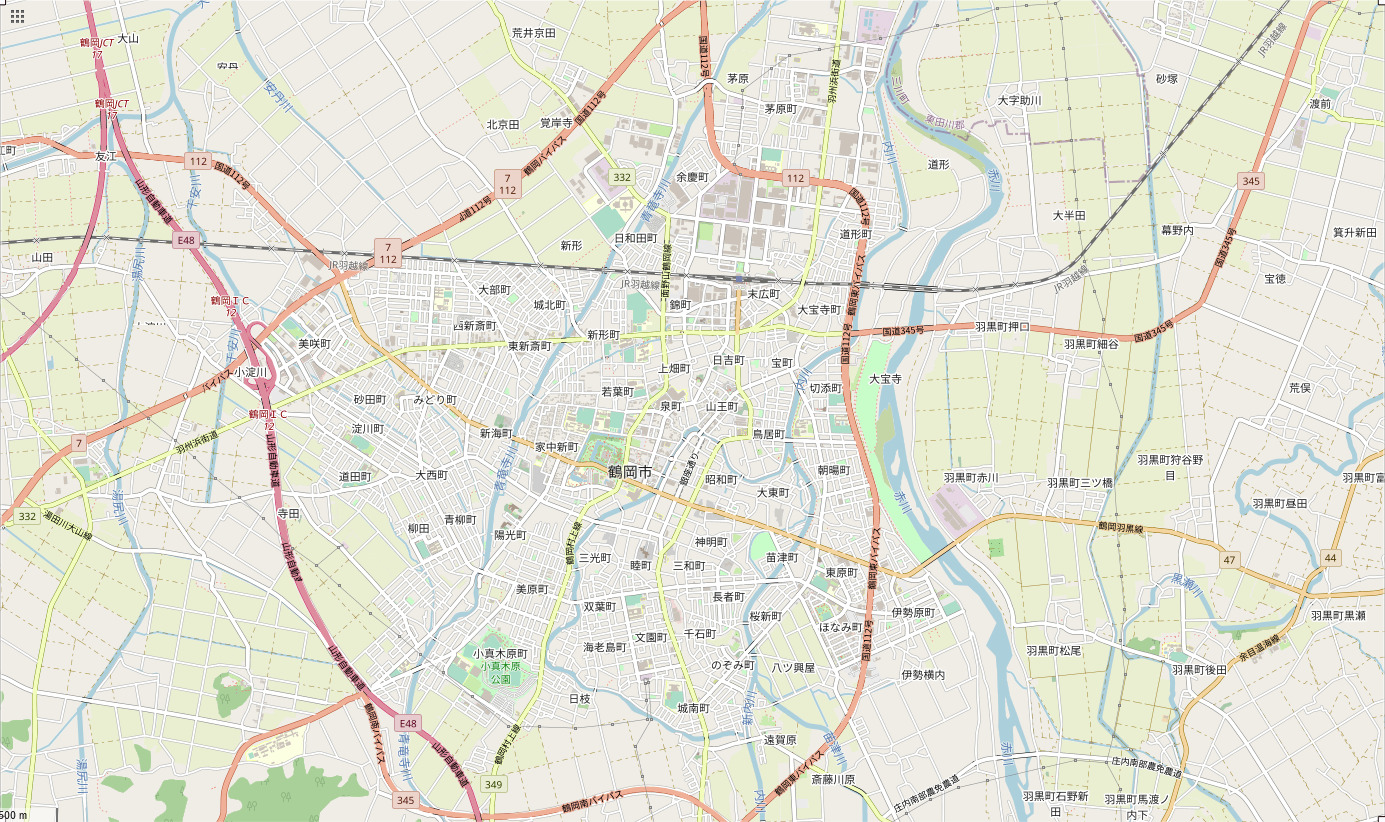
- Location within Tsuruoka, Yamagata Location within Yamagata Prefecture Location within Japan
- Type: Japanese garden
- Location: Tsuruoka, Yamagata, Japan
- Coordinates: 38°43′43″N 139°49′17″E
- Status: Open
- National Palace of Scenic Beauty

The Sakai clan Gardens (酒井氏庭園, Sakai-shi teien) is a traditional Japanese garden located in Chidō Museum, which is a nationally designated Place of Scenic Beauty

This garden was garden of the Sakai clan, daimyō of Shōnai Domain and was constructed in the third bailey of Tsuruoka Castle at some time after Sakai Tadakatsu became daimyō in 1622. It is a rare example of a Shoin-style garden in northern Japan, and includes a pond, dry waterfall, numerous stones to form an artificial canyon, and included a view of distant Mount Chōkai as part of a borrowed scenery. It was restored in 1971 and designated as a National Place of Scenic Beauty in 1976. The garden is part of the Chidō Museum, which includes the former Chidōkan han school and a giyōfū style building which was formerly the Yamagata Prefectural Police headquarters.

== See also ==
- List of National Treasures of Japan (crafts: swords)
- List of Cultural Properties of Japan - paintings (Yamagata)
- List of Important Tangible Folk Cultural Properties
- List of Important Tangible Folk Cultural Properties (occupation)
