= Seto Inland Sea Folk History Museum =

- 瀬戸内海歴史民俗資料館
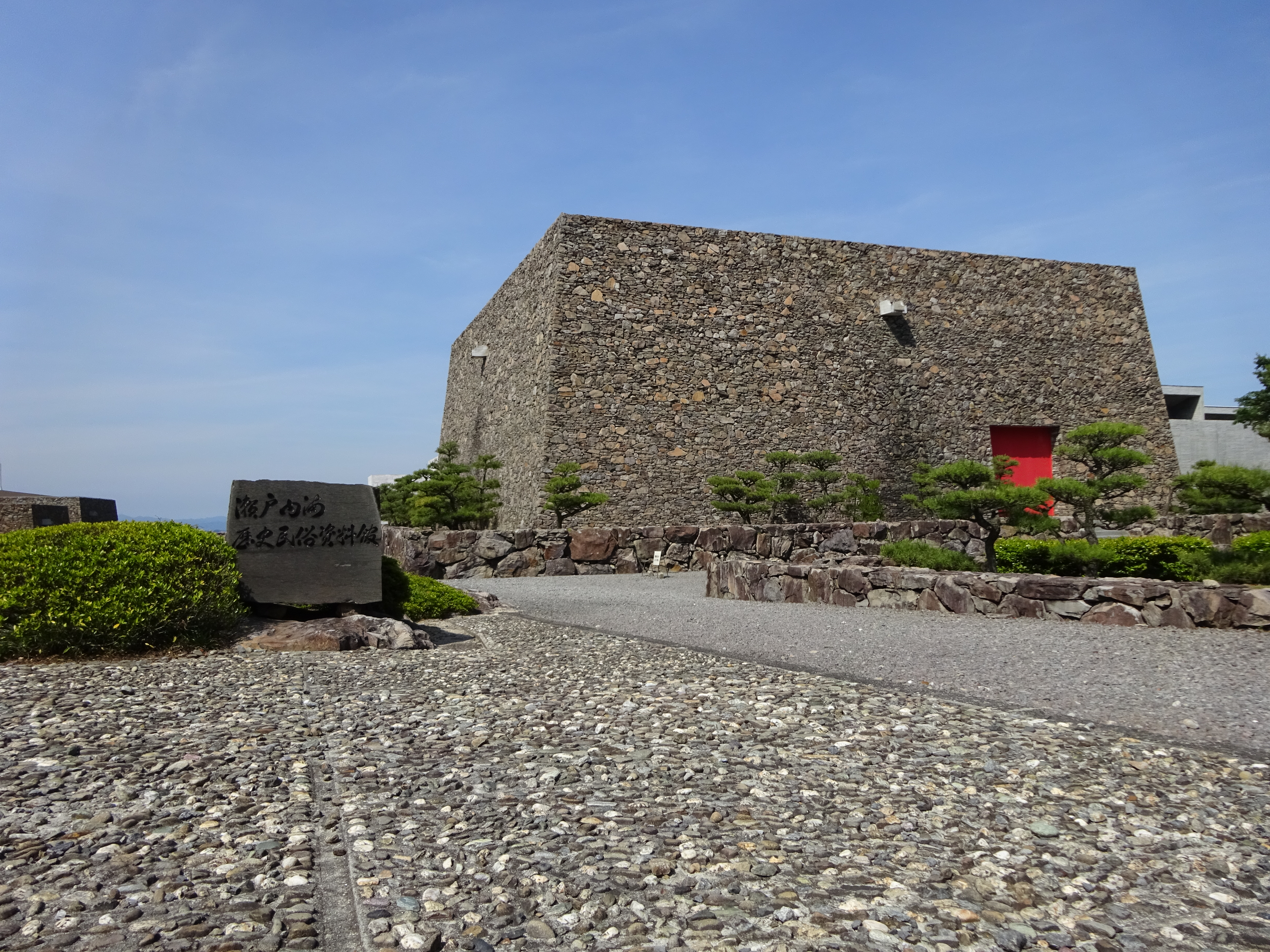
- Interactive map of the Seto Inland Sea Folk History Museum area

General information
- Location: 1412-2 Tarumi-chō, Takamatsu, Kagawa Prefecture, Japan
- Coordinates: 34°22′41″N 133°55′52″E
- Opened: 3 November 1973

Design and construction
- Architect: Tadashi Yamamoto

Website
- Official website (ja)

The Seto Inland Sea Folk History Museum (瀬戸内海歴史民俗資料館, Seto Naikai Rekishi Minzoku Shiryōkan) is a prefectural museum in Takamatsu, Japan, dedicated to the history and culture of the Seto Inland Sea and Setouchi region. It was established in 1973, and since 2008 has operated as an annex of The Kagawa Museum. The collection of some 22,000 items includes 5,966 that have been collectively designated as three Important Tangible Folk Cultural Properties. The museum building, located on the Goshikidai Plateau within the Setonaikai National Park, and designed by athlete-architect Tadashi Yamamoto, won an AIJ Prize.

== See also ==
- List of Important Tangible Folk Cultural Properties
- List of Historic Sites of Japan (Kagawa)
