= Tochigi Prefectural Museum of Fine Arts =

- 栃木県立美術館
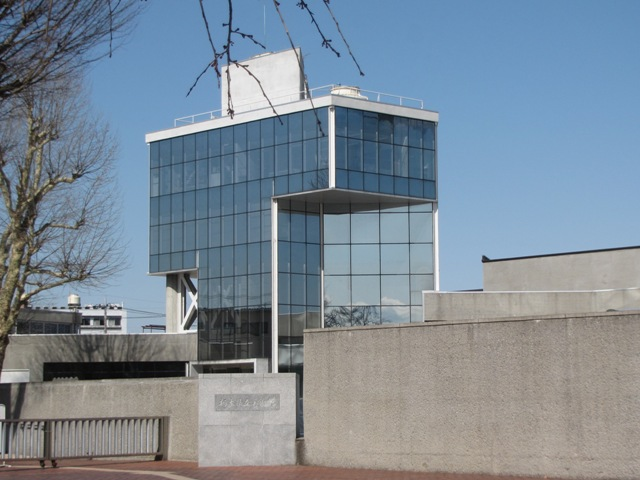
- Interactive map of the Tochigi Prefectural Museum of Fine Arts area

General information
- Location: 4-2-7 Sakura, Utsunomiya, Tochigi Prefecture, Japan
- Coordinates: 36°34′03″N 139°51′58″E
- Opened: 3 November 1972

Website
- Official website

Tochigi Prefectural Museum of Fine Arts (栃木県立美術館, Tochigi Kenritsu Bijutsukan) opened in Utsunomiya, Tochigi Prefecture, Japan, in 1972. The collection includes works by Hamada Shōji, Takahashi Yuichi, Constable, Corot, Gainsborough, Monet, and Turner, and special exhibitions are also mounted.

== See also ==
- Tochigi Prefectural Museum
- Utsunomiya Museum of Art
