= Shikoku Mura =

Open-air agricultural park in Shikoku, Japan

Coordinates: 34°20′44″N 134°06′32″E

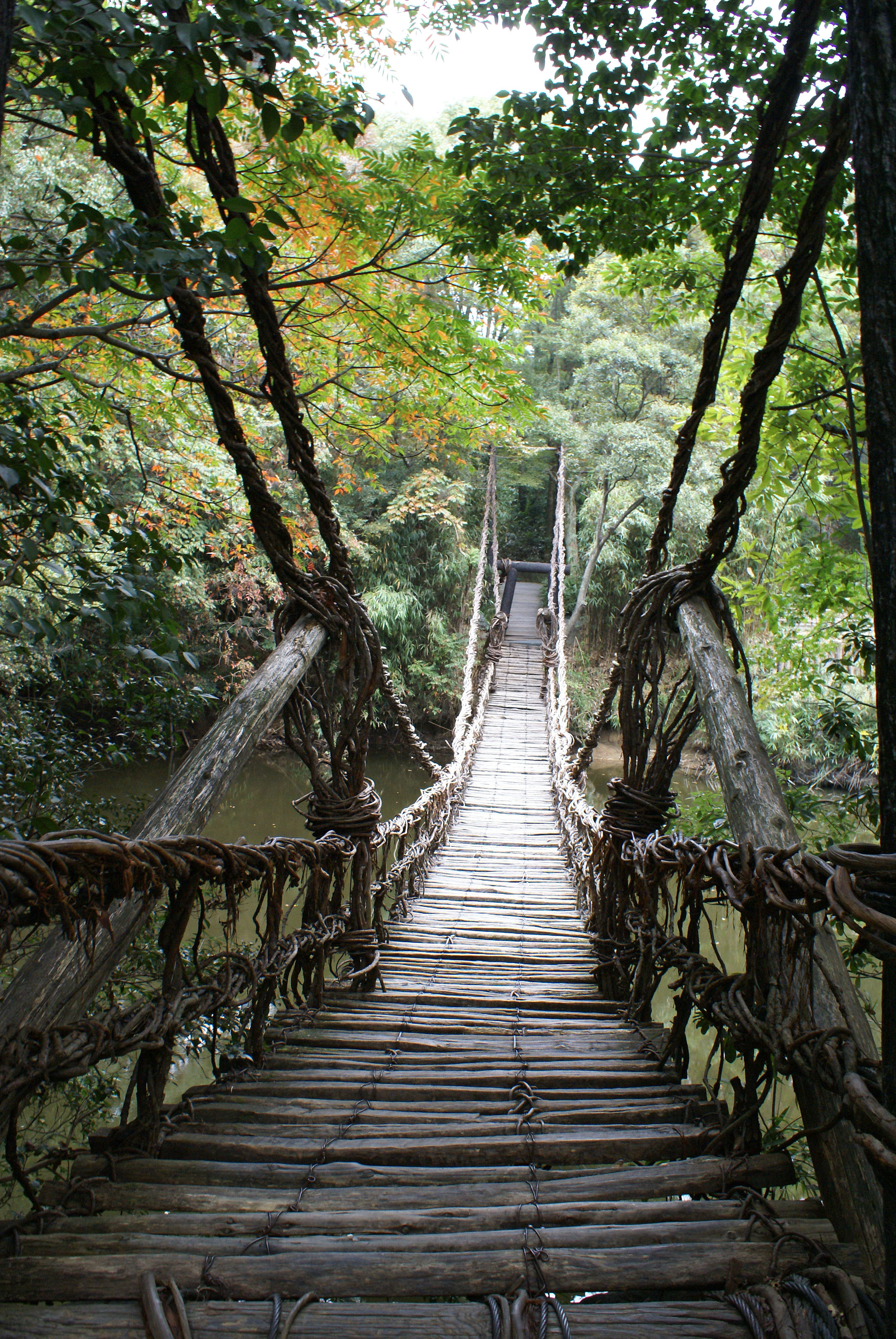
Shikoku Mura in Takamatsu

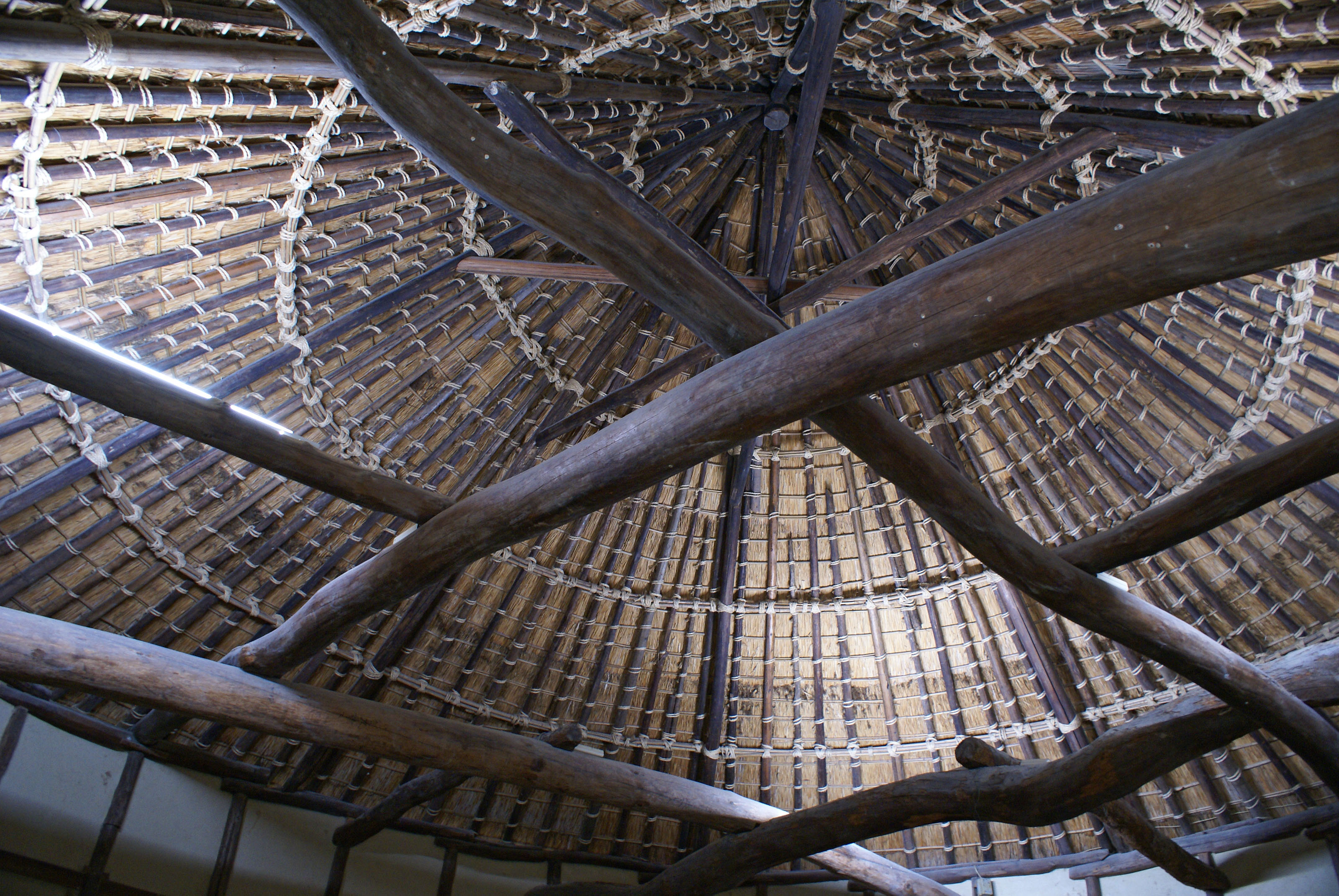
Detail of supports for a roof

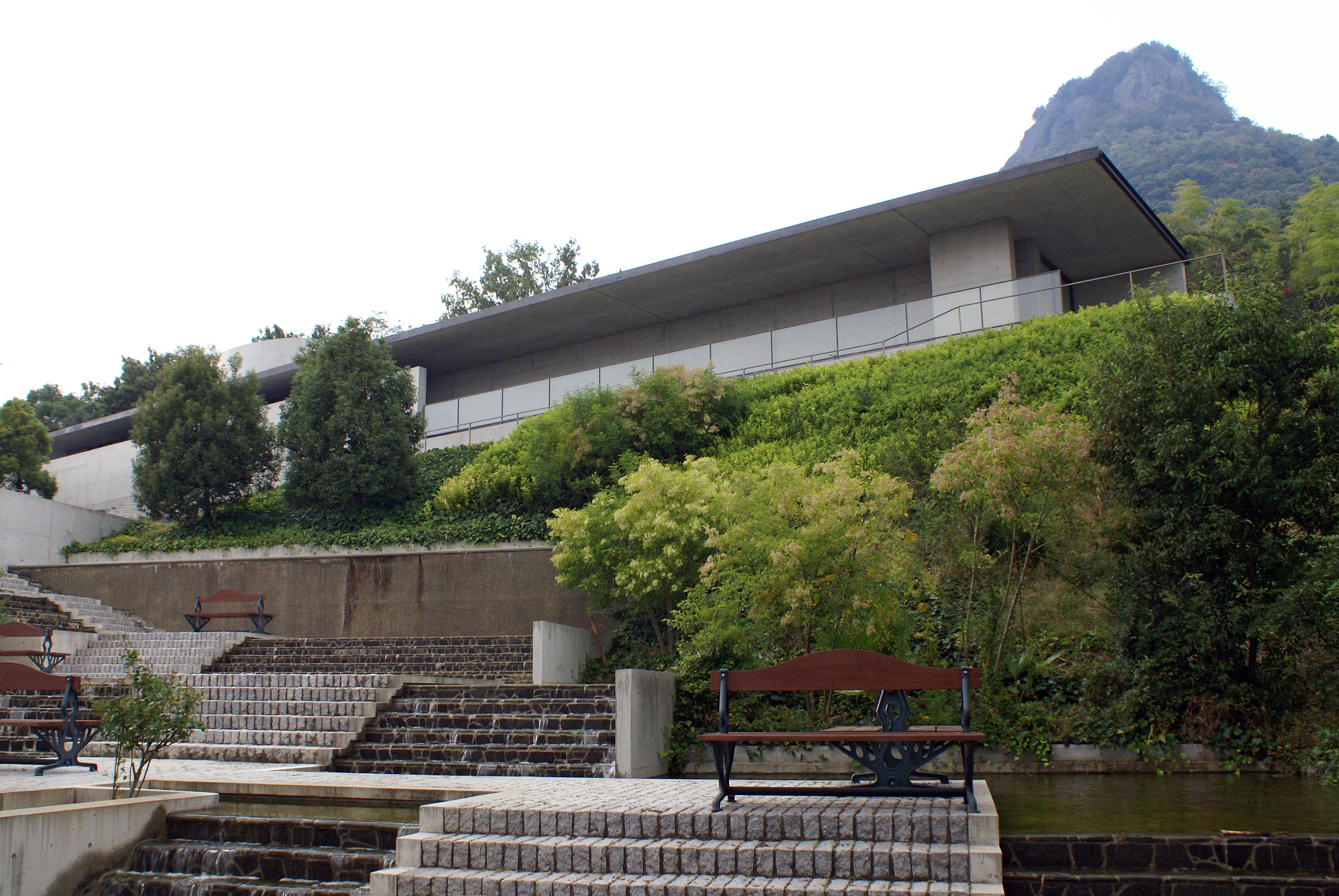
Shikoku Mura Gallery by Tadao Ando (2002)

Shikoku Mura (四国村) is an open-air architectural park in Takamatsu, Kagawa Prefecture, Japan. It houses over twenty buildings from around Shikoku dating from the Edo period through to the Taishō period, four of which have been designated Important Cultural Properties. The park opened in 1976 and covers an area of approximately fifty thousand square metres.

== Important Cultural Properties ==
- Former Kōno residence (旧河野家住宅) (18th Century)
- Former Shimoki residence (旧下木家住宅) (1781)
- Sugar cane processing facility (讃岐及び周辺地域の砂糖製造用具と砂糖しめ小屋) (1909)
- Soy sauce production facility (讃岐及び周辺地域の醤油醸造用具と醤油蔵・麹室) (Meiji period)

== Gallery ==
An exhibition space designed by Tadao Ando opened in 2002.

== See also ==
- Meiji-mura
- Minka
- Japanese architecture
