= Osaka Prefectural Chikatsu Asuka Museum =

- 大阪府立近つ飛鳥博物館
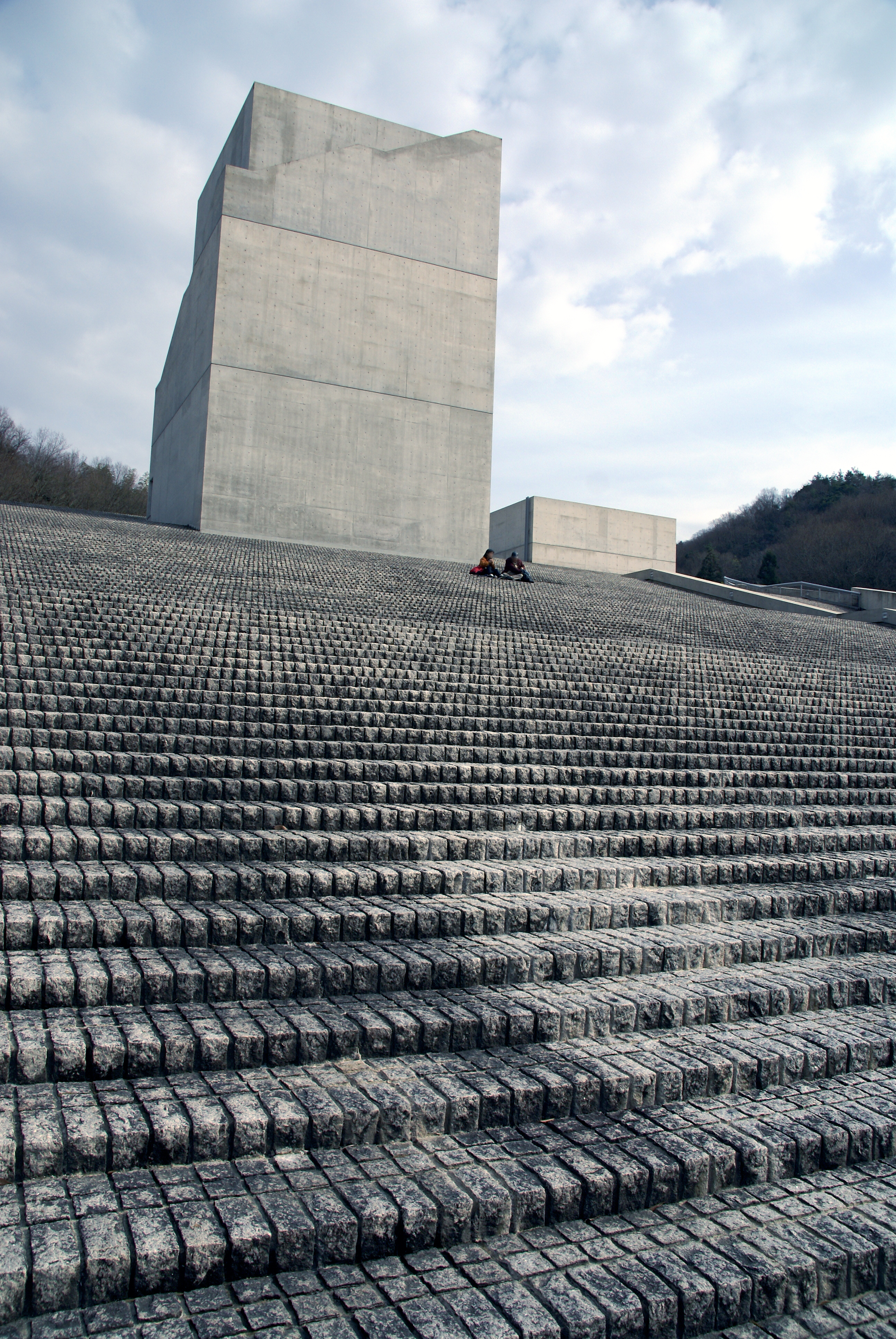
- Interactive map of the Osaka Prefectural Chikatsu Asuka Museum area

General information
- Location: 299 Higashiyama, Kanan, Ōsaka Prefecture, Japan
- Coordinates: 34°30′11″N 135°38′37″E
- Opened: 1994

Website
- homepage

Osaka Prefectural Chikatsu Asuka Museum (大阪府立近つ飛鳥博物館, Ōsaka Furitsu Chikatsu Asuka Hakubutsukan) is a prefectural museum in Kanan, Ōsaka Prefecture, Japan dedicated to the area of Chikatsu Asuka during the Kofun and Asuka periods. The region is first documented in the Kojiki. The Chikatsu Asuka Fudoki-No-Oka Historical Park contains over two hundred burial mounds including four imperial tombs and those of Shōtoku Taishi and Ono no Imoko. The exhibition hall is divided into three sections: (1) Foreign influence during the Kofun and Asuka periods; (2) Kofun and the origins of the ancient realm; and (3) The application of science to cultural heritage. The museum was designed by Tadao Ando and opened in 1994.

== See also ==
- List of Historic Sites of Japan (Ōsaka)
