= Hida Minzoku Mura Folk Village =

Coordinates: 36.132246°N 137.234438°E

Hida Folk Village, Hida no Sato
- 飛騨民俗村, 飛騨の里
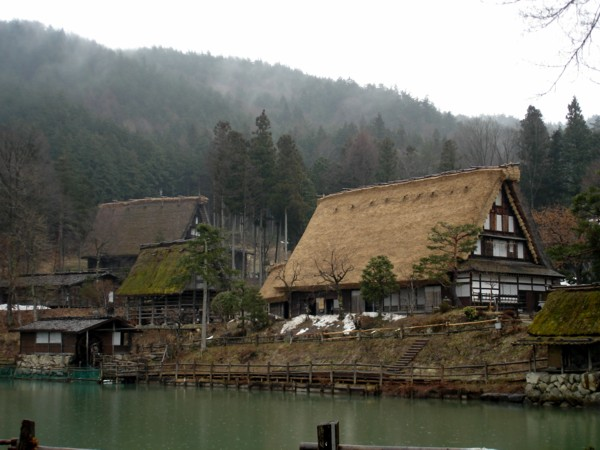
- View of the main lake of the village and one of the more prominent homes from near the entrance

- Location within Japan
- Location: Takayama, Gifu Prefecture, Japan
- Type: Folk museum
- Website: hidanosato.com

Hida Folk Village, Hida no Sato (飛騨民俗村, 飛騨の里, Hida Minzoku Mura, Hida no Sato) is an open-air museum of close to 30 old farmhouses illustrating the traditional architectural styles of the mountainous regions of Japan. Of particular interest are the thatched and shingled roofs, such as the gasshō-zukuri-styled buildings. Many of the buildings were brought from their original sites to preserve them. The village is picturesquely situated on a hillside overlooking the Takayama Valley and surrounding a large pond. It is in the city of Takayama, Gifu Prefecture, Japan, about 2.5 km (1.6 mi) southwest of the train station.

The structures range from 100 to 500 years in age. Many are open to perusal and are filled with artifacts from their respective periods, including spindles, silk worm raising artifacts, cooking utensils, and clothing. There is a workshop illustrating how many of Japan's famous handicrafts are made, including wood carving, tie-dyeing, weaving, and lacquer work. Sometimes it is referred to as "the village hidden in the leaf".

Four of the buildings are listed as National Important Cultural Properties (ICPs) and seven more are listed as Gifu Prefectural ICPs and one as a Takayama City ICP. There is also one western-style building from the Meiji period, which is a Registered Tangible Cultural Properties

== Gallery ==
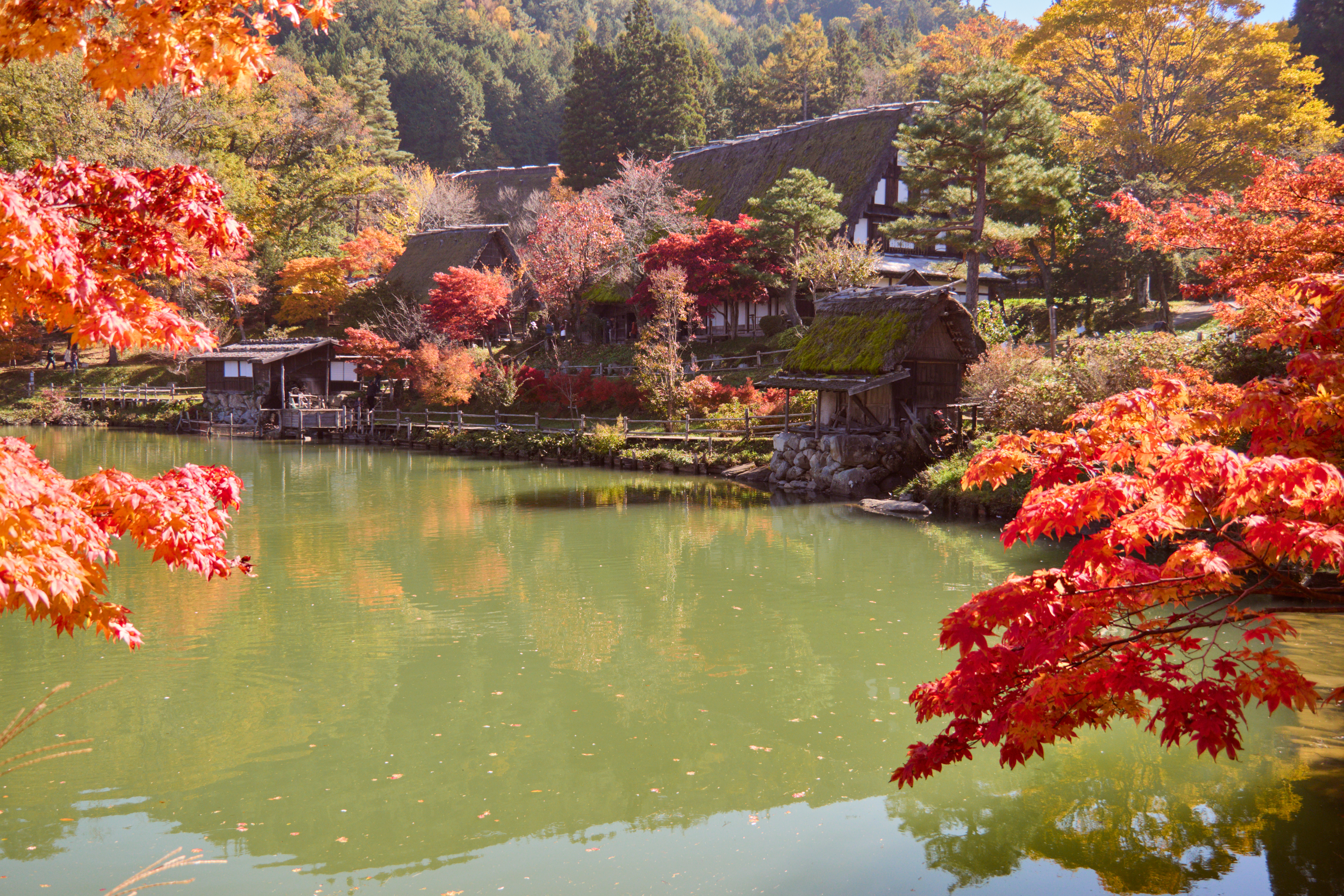

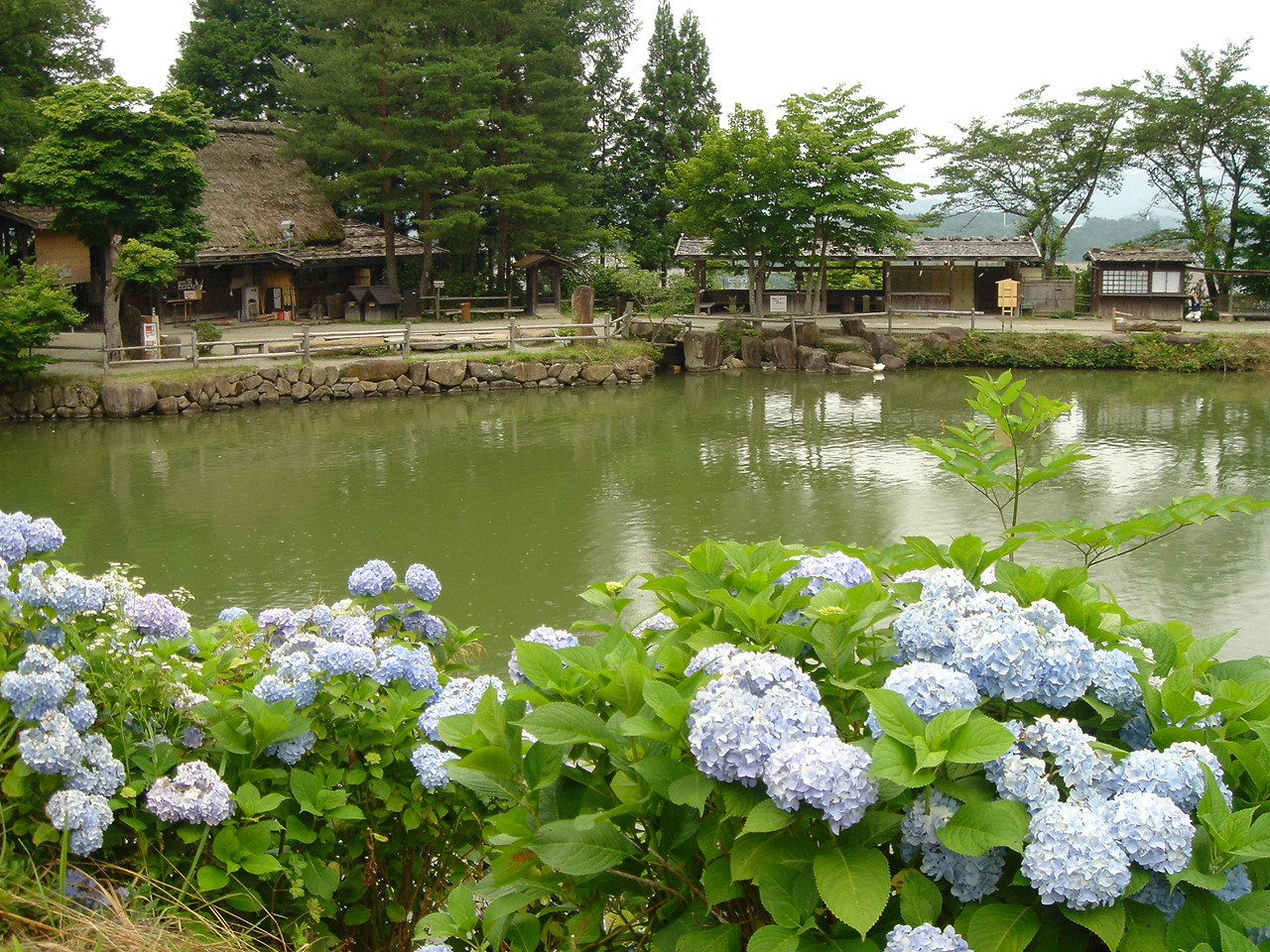

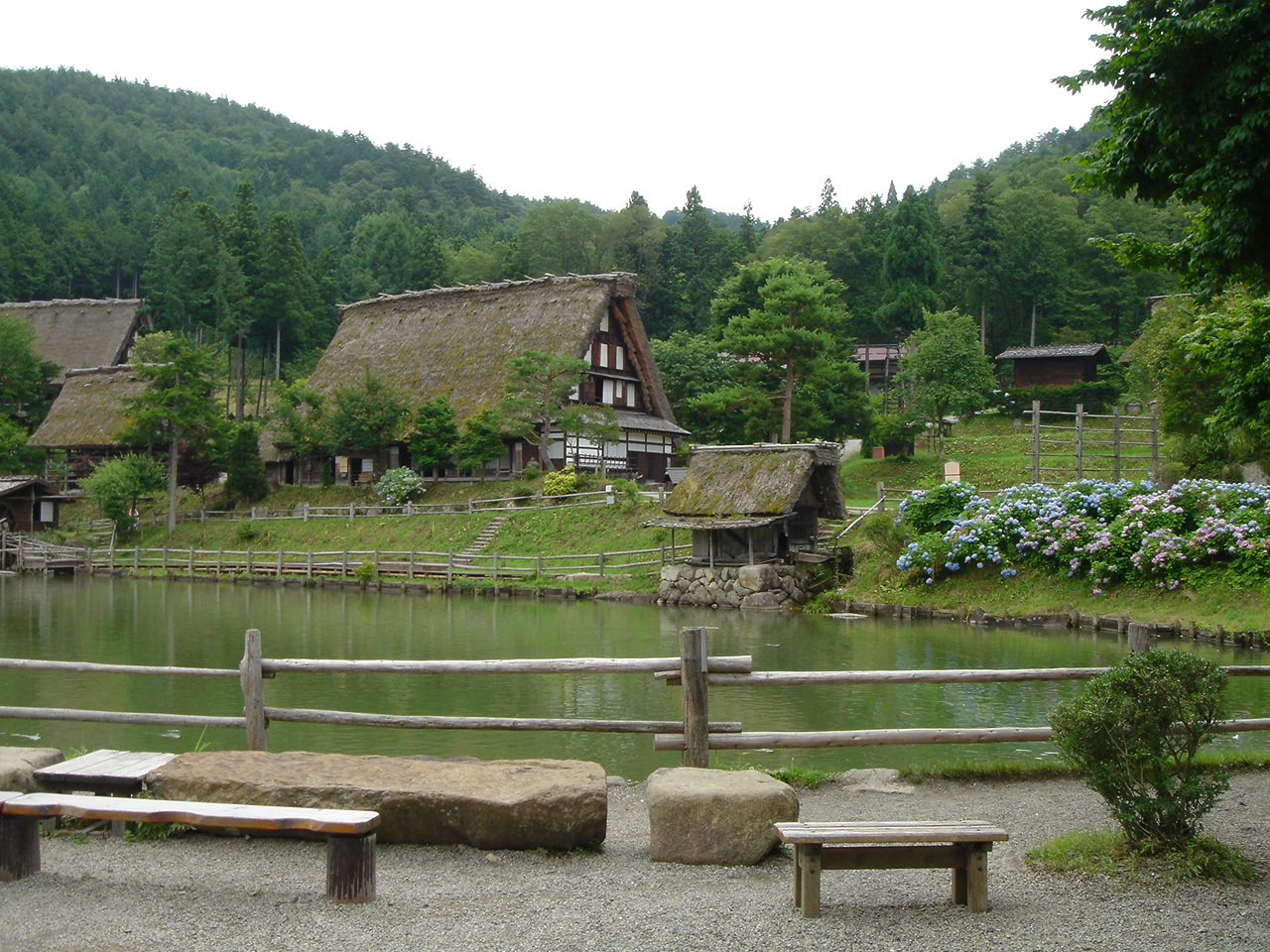

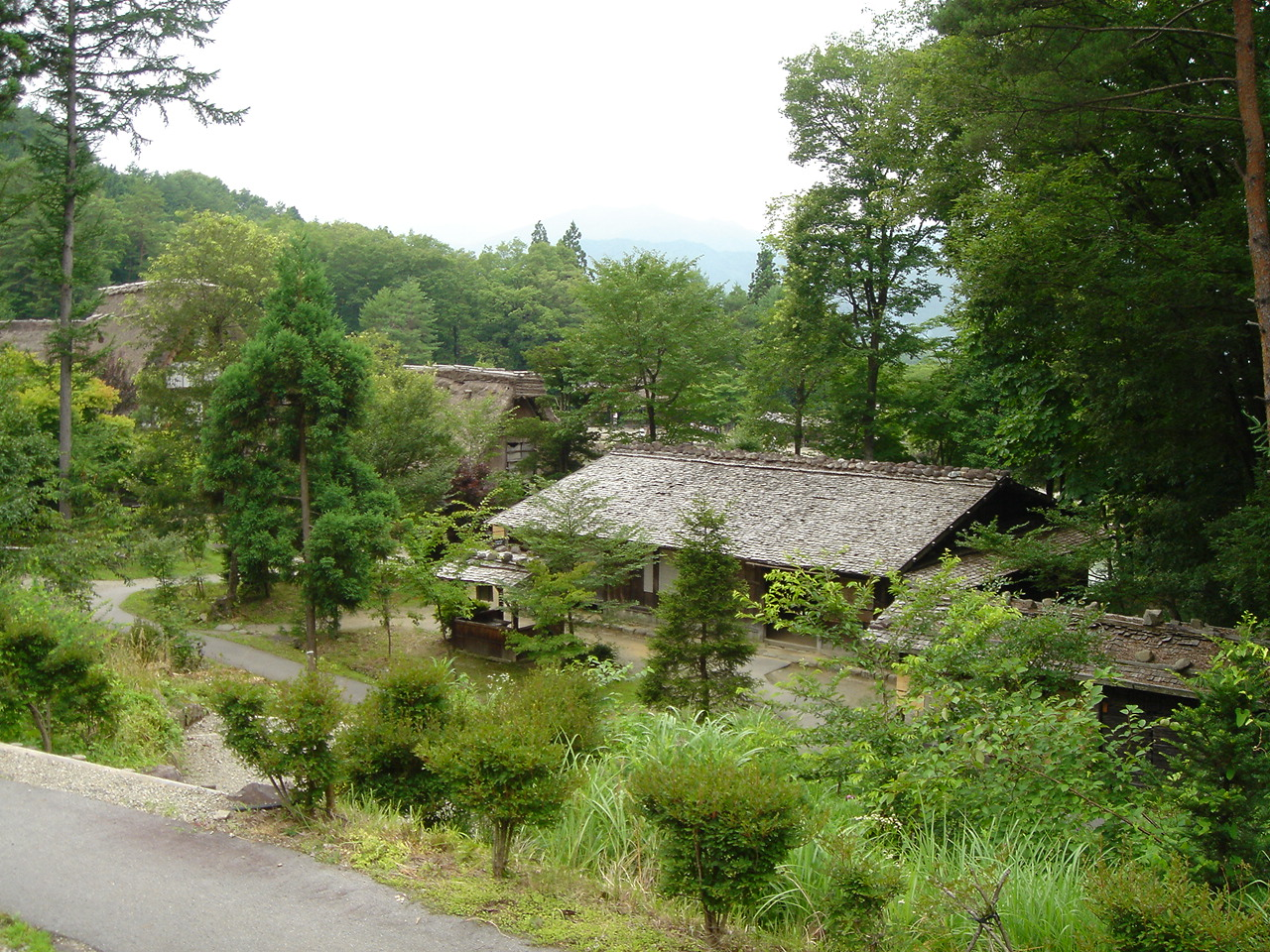

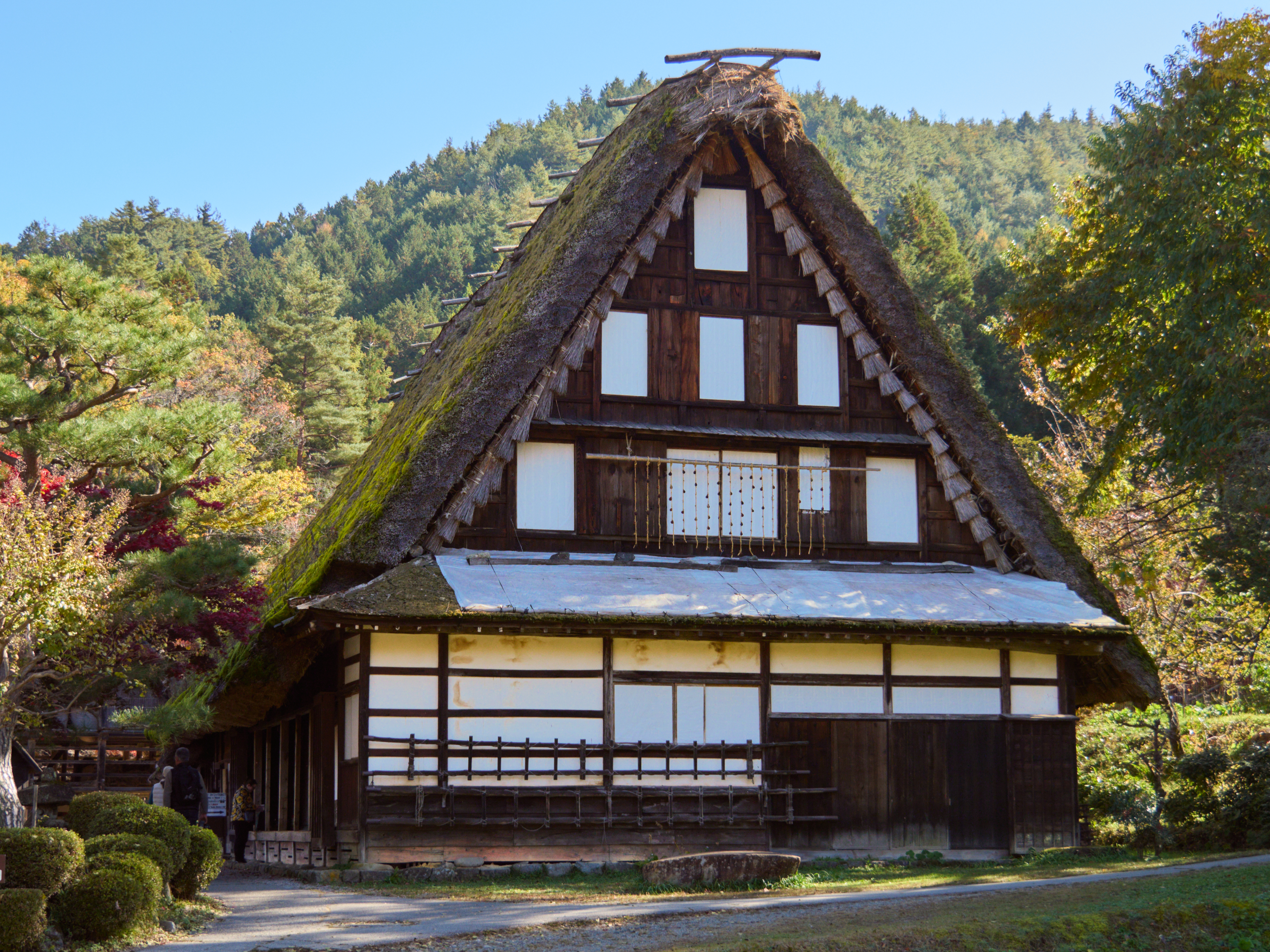

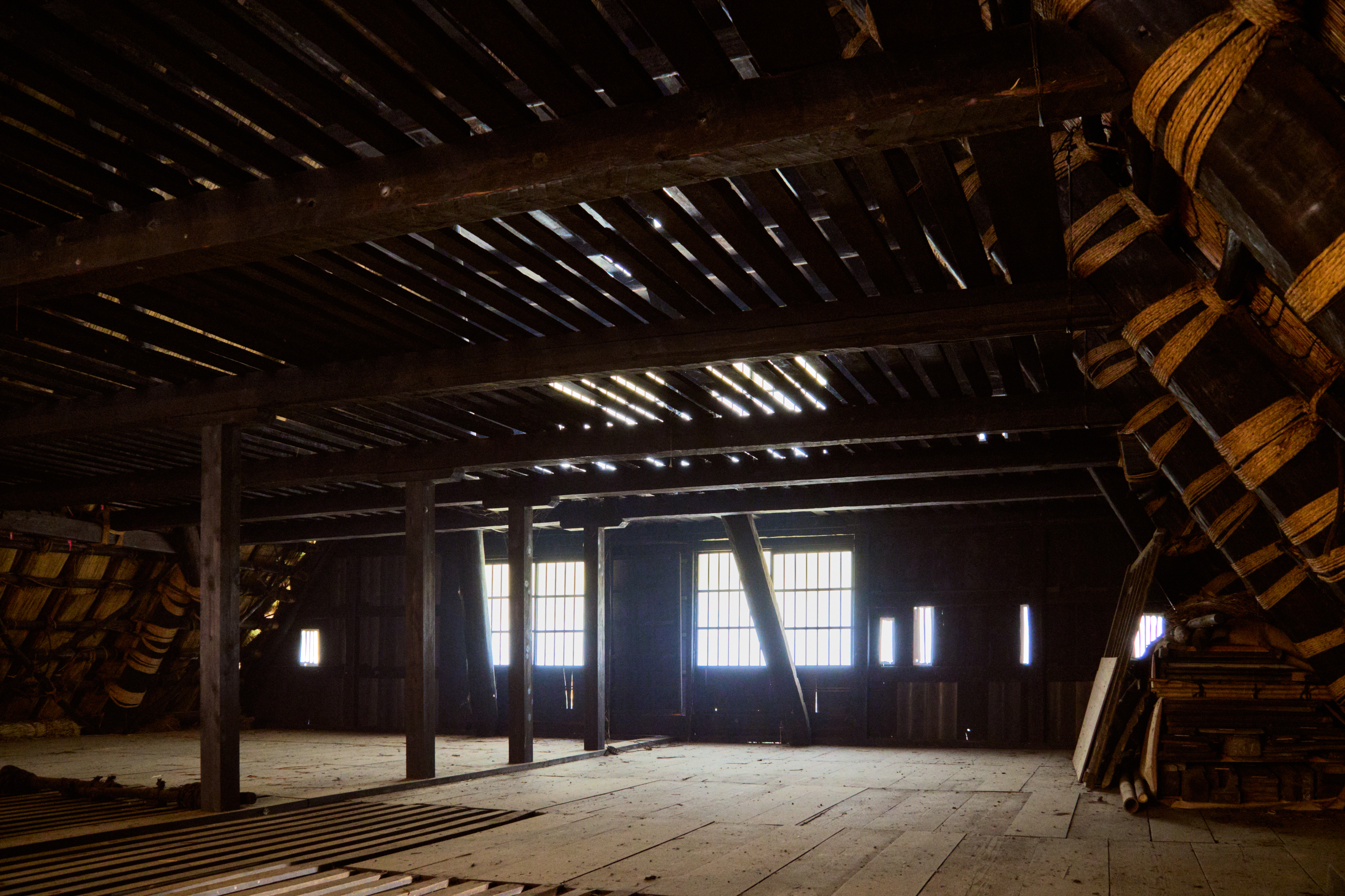

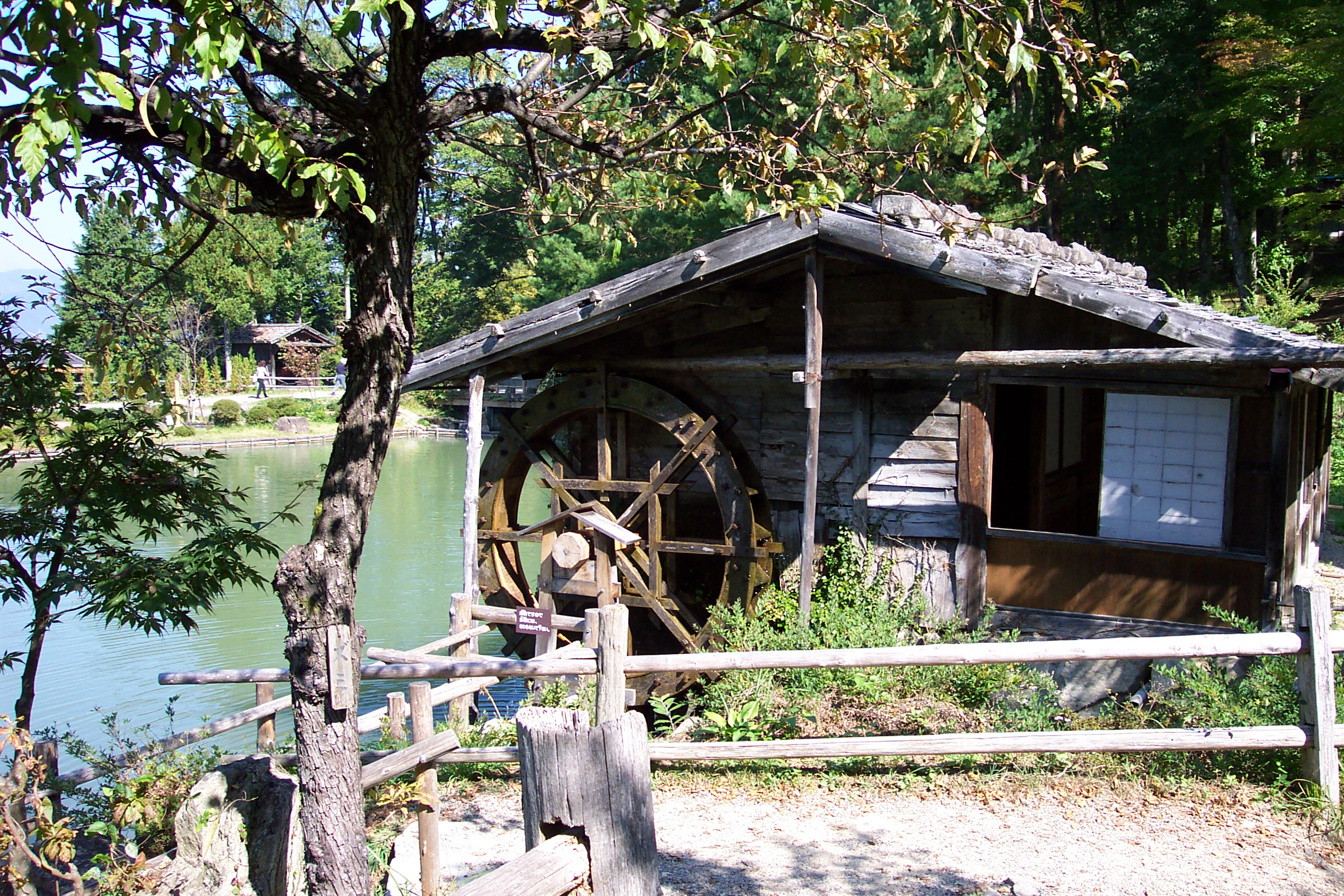

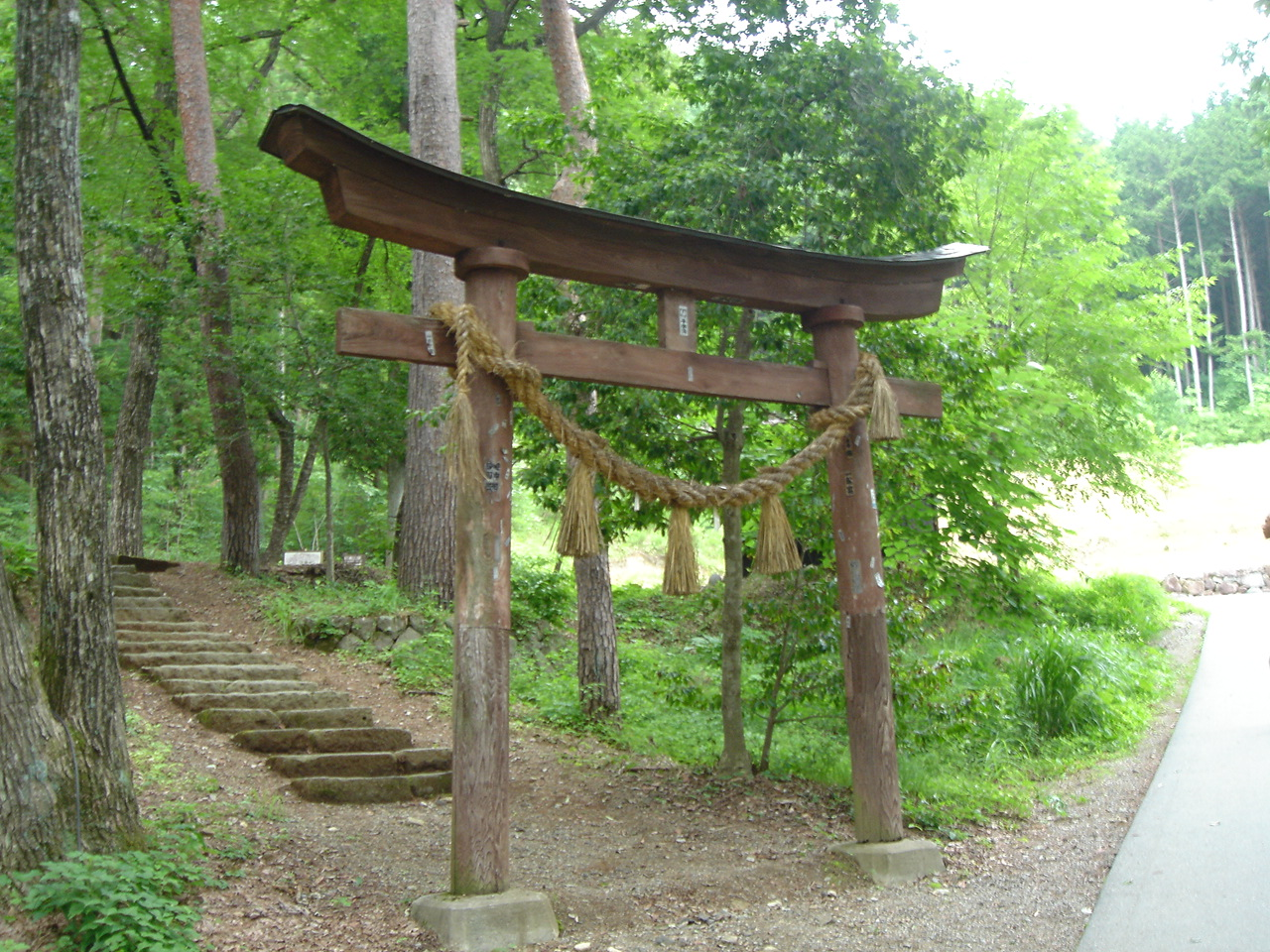

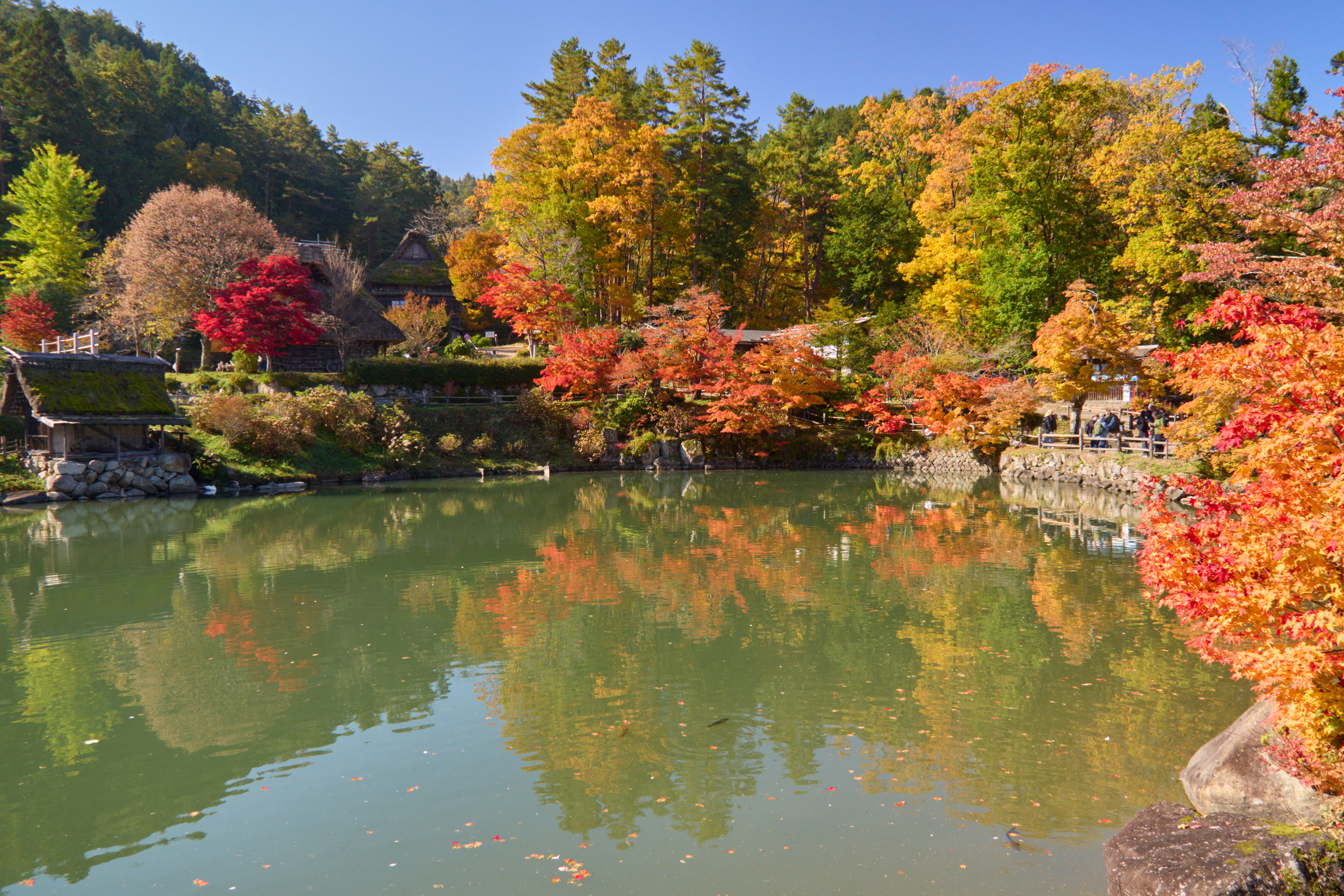

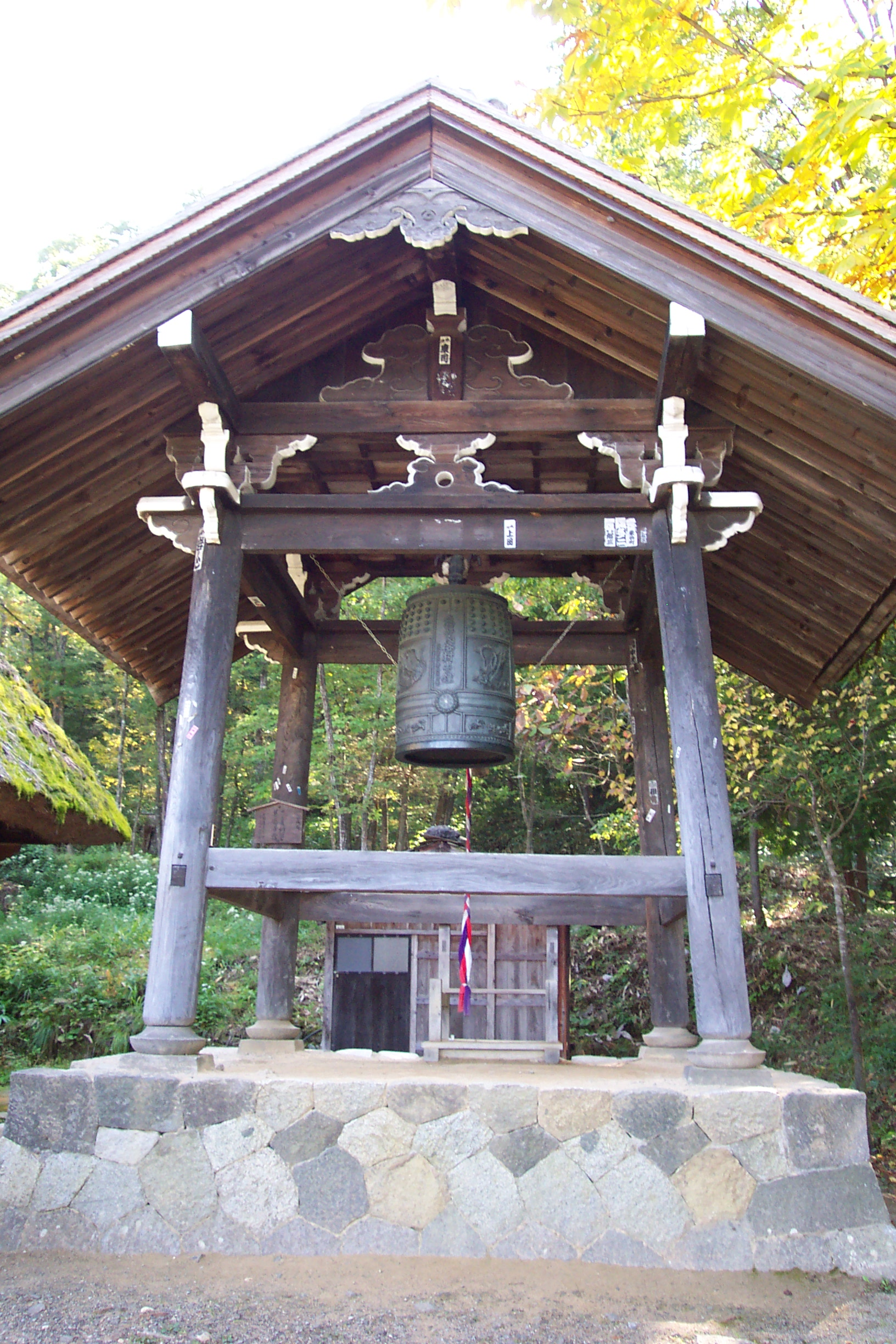

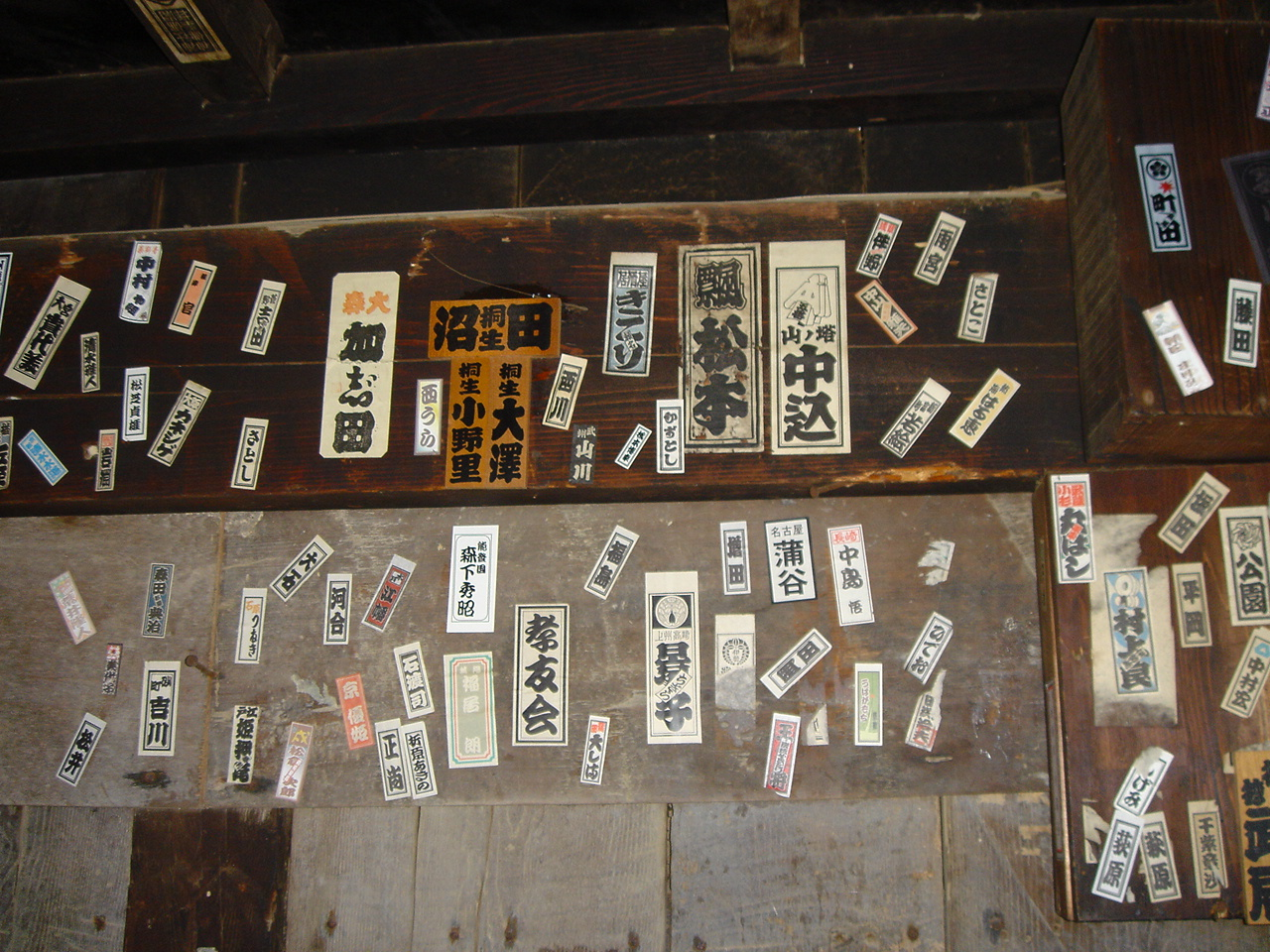

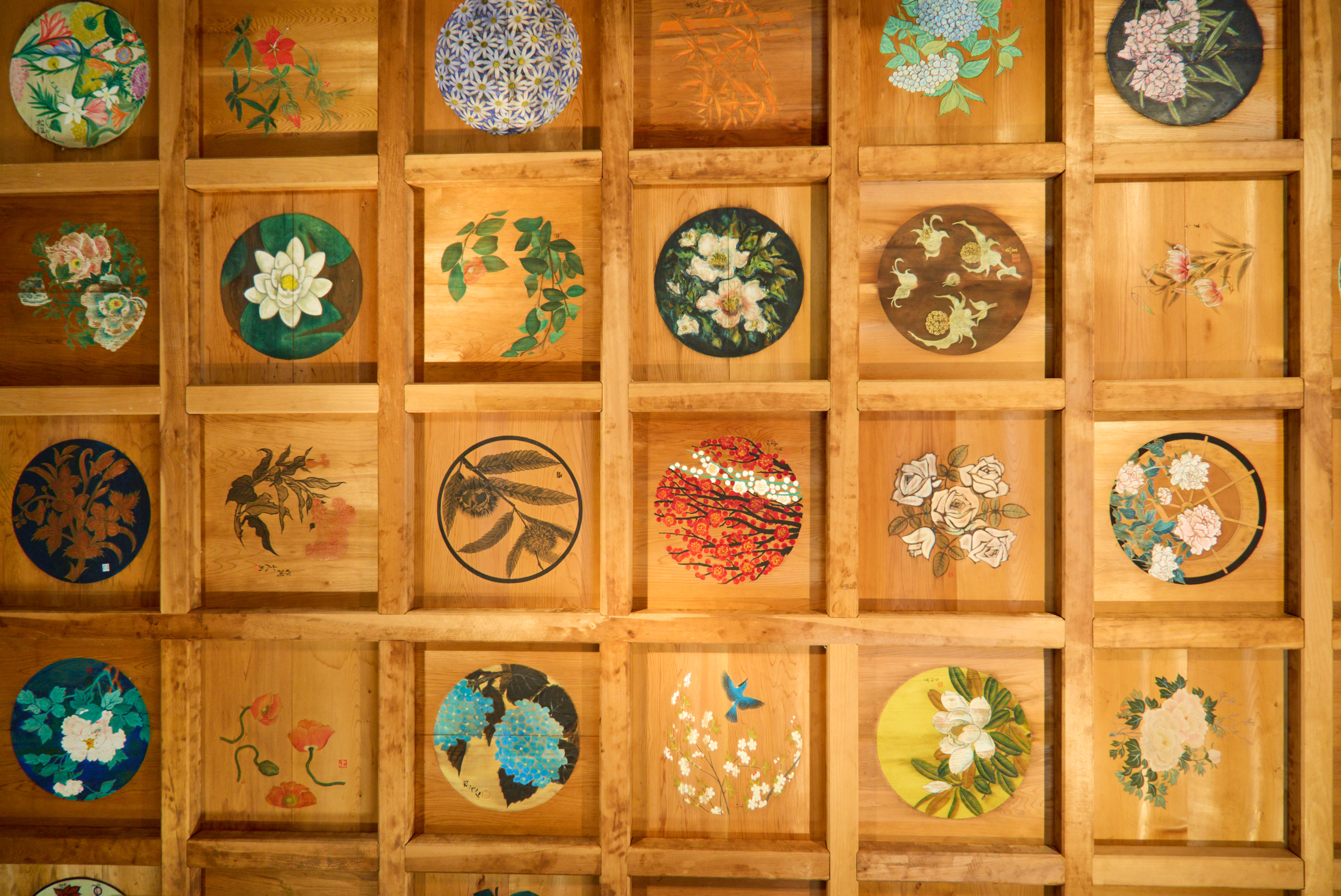

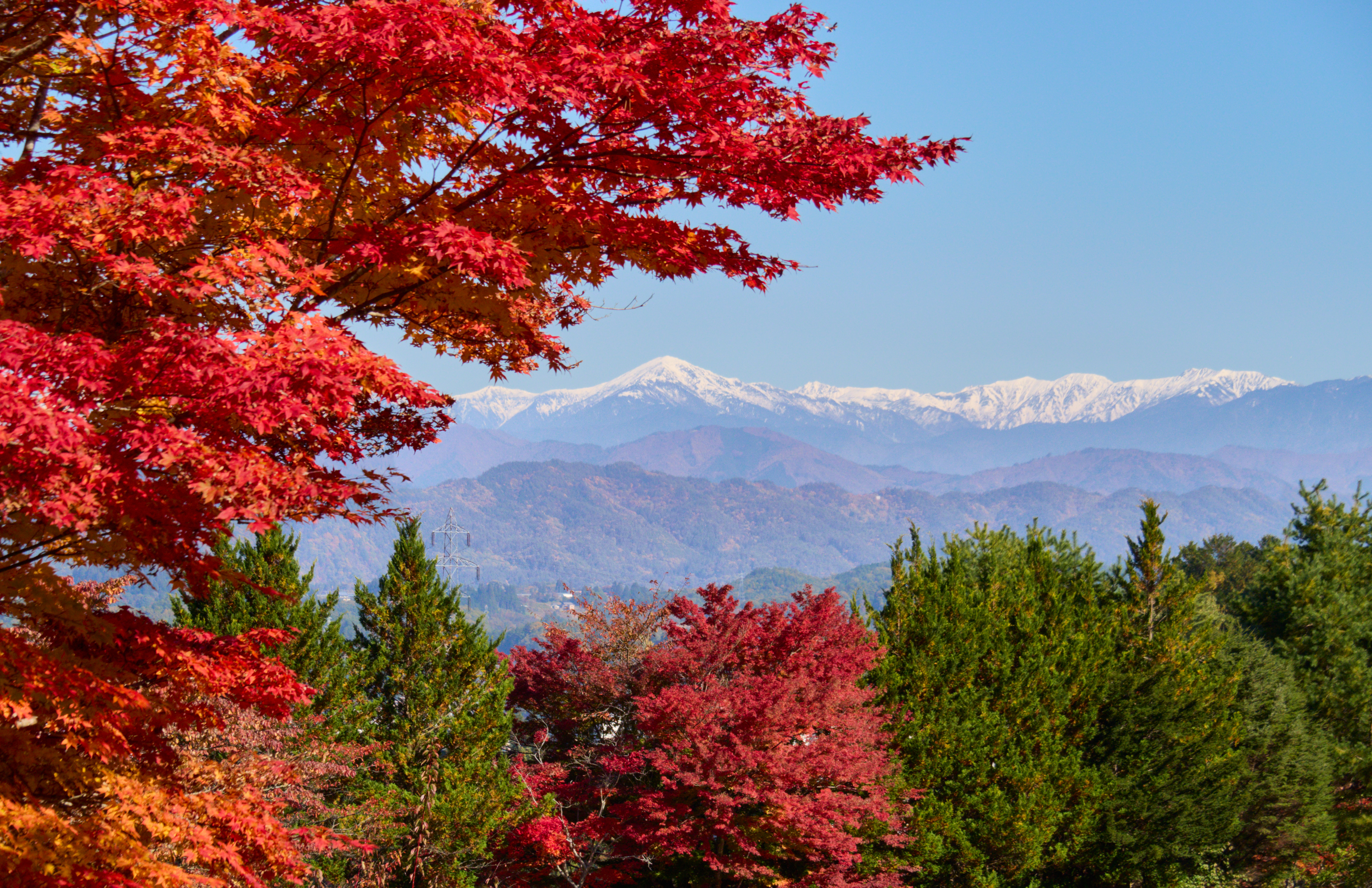

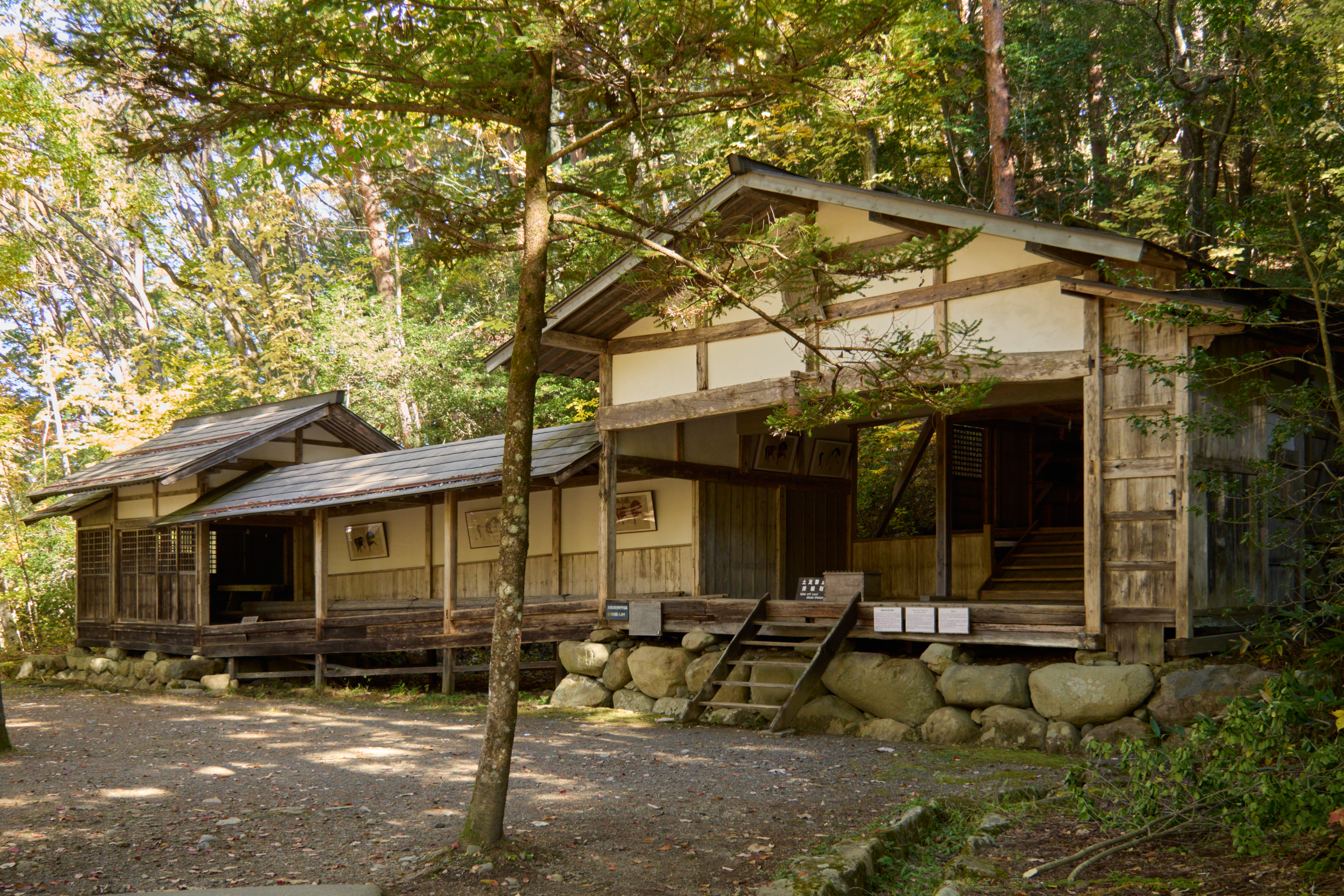

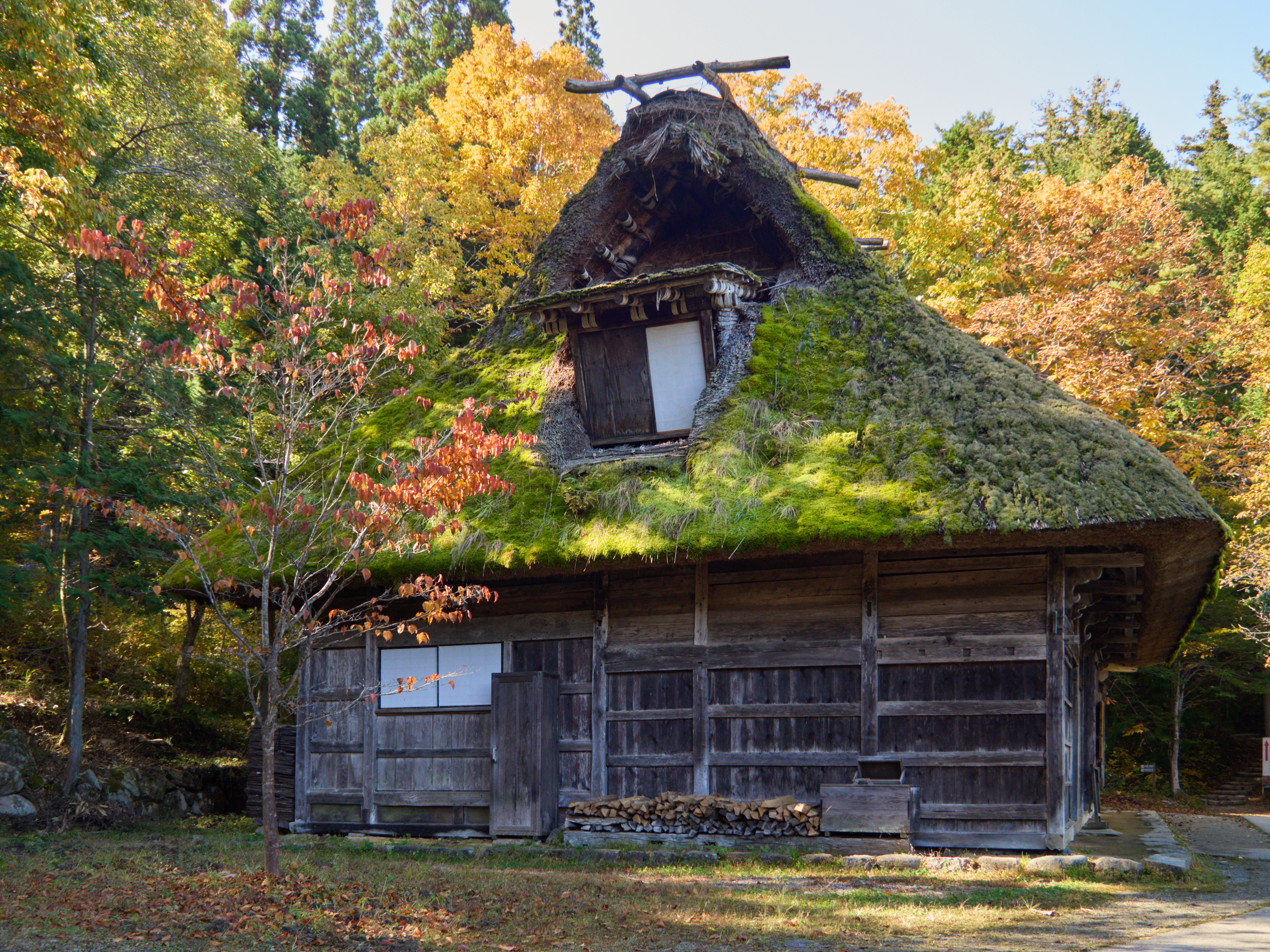
