= Miyazaki Prefectural Art Museum =

- 宮崎県立美術館
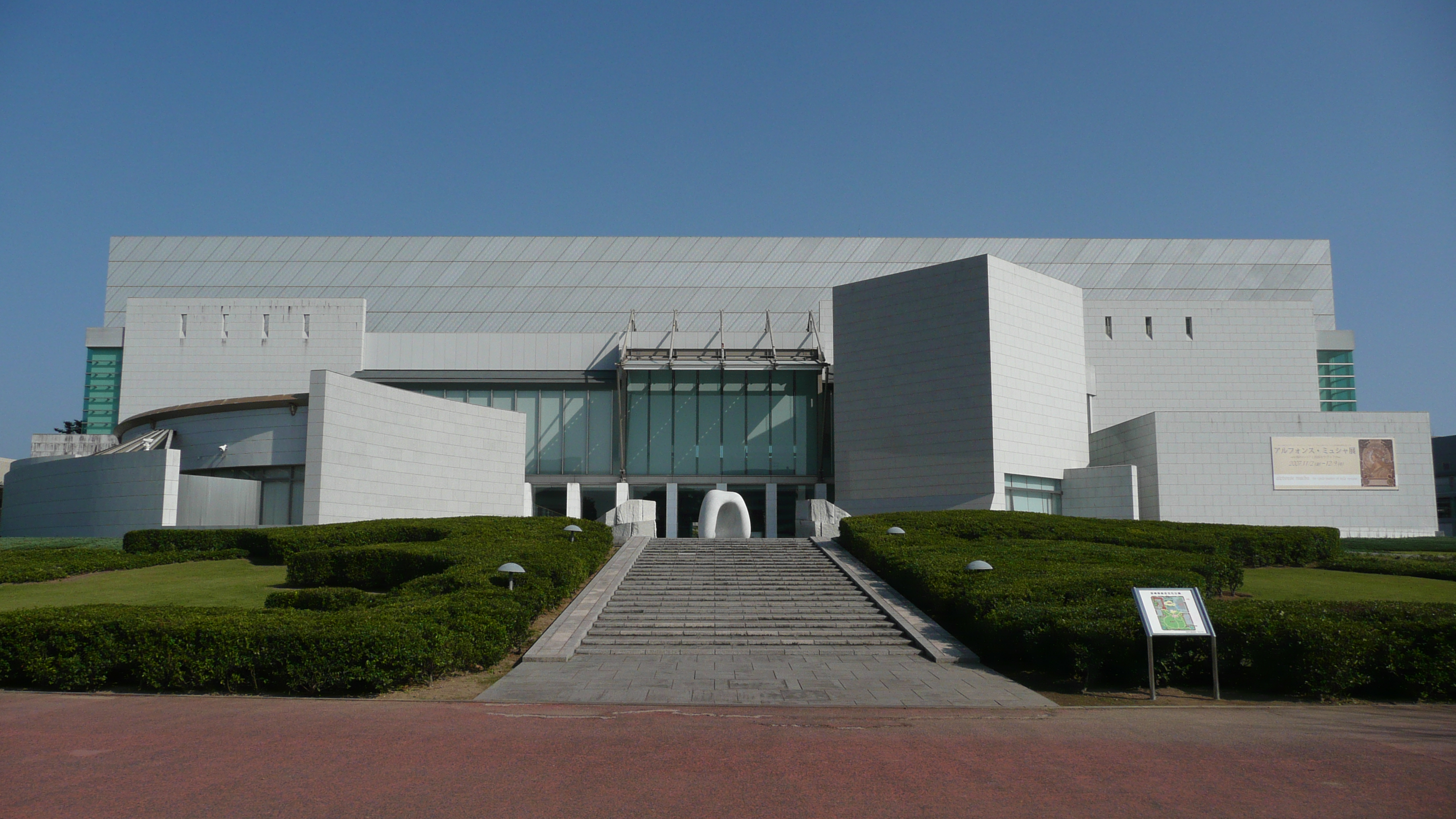
- Interactive map of the Miyazaki Prefectural Art Museum area

General information
- Location: 3-210 Funatsuka, Miyazaki, Miyazaki Prefecture, Japan
- Coordinates: 31°56′3″N 131°25′10″E
- Opened: October 1995

Website
- homepage

Miyazaki Prefectural Art Museum (宮崎県立美術館, Miyazaki Kenritsu Bijutsukan) was established in Miyazaki, Japan, in 1995. The collection focuses on artists from or associated with Miyazaki Prefecture and also includes works by Picasso, Klee, and Magritte.

== See also ==
- Miyazaki Prefectural Museum of Nature and History
- Miyazaki Jingū
