= Tochigi Prefectural Museum =

- 栃木県立博物館
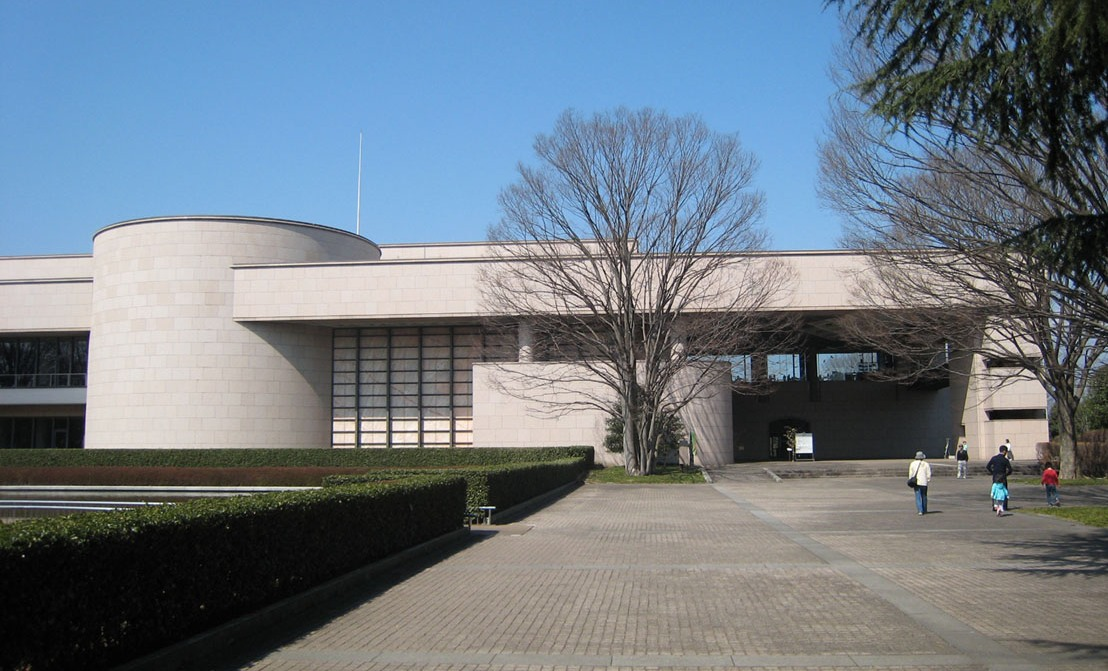
- Interactive map of the Tochigi Prefectural Museum area

General information
- Location: 2-2 Mutsumichō, Utsunomiya, Tochigi Prefecture, Japan
- Coordinates: 36°33′34.5″N 139°51′38.5″E
- Opened: October 1982

Website
- homepage

Tochigi Prefectural Museum (栃木県立博物館, Tochigi Kenritsu Hakubutsukan) is a prefectural museum in the city of Utsunomiya, Japan. The collection relates to the history and natural history of Tochigi Prefecture. The museum opened in 1982.

== See also ==
- Shimotsuke Province
- List of Historic Sites of Japan (Tochigi)
