= Saitama Prefectural Museum of History and Folklore =

- 埼玉県立歴史と民俗の博物館
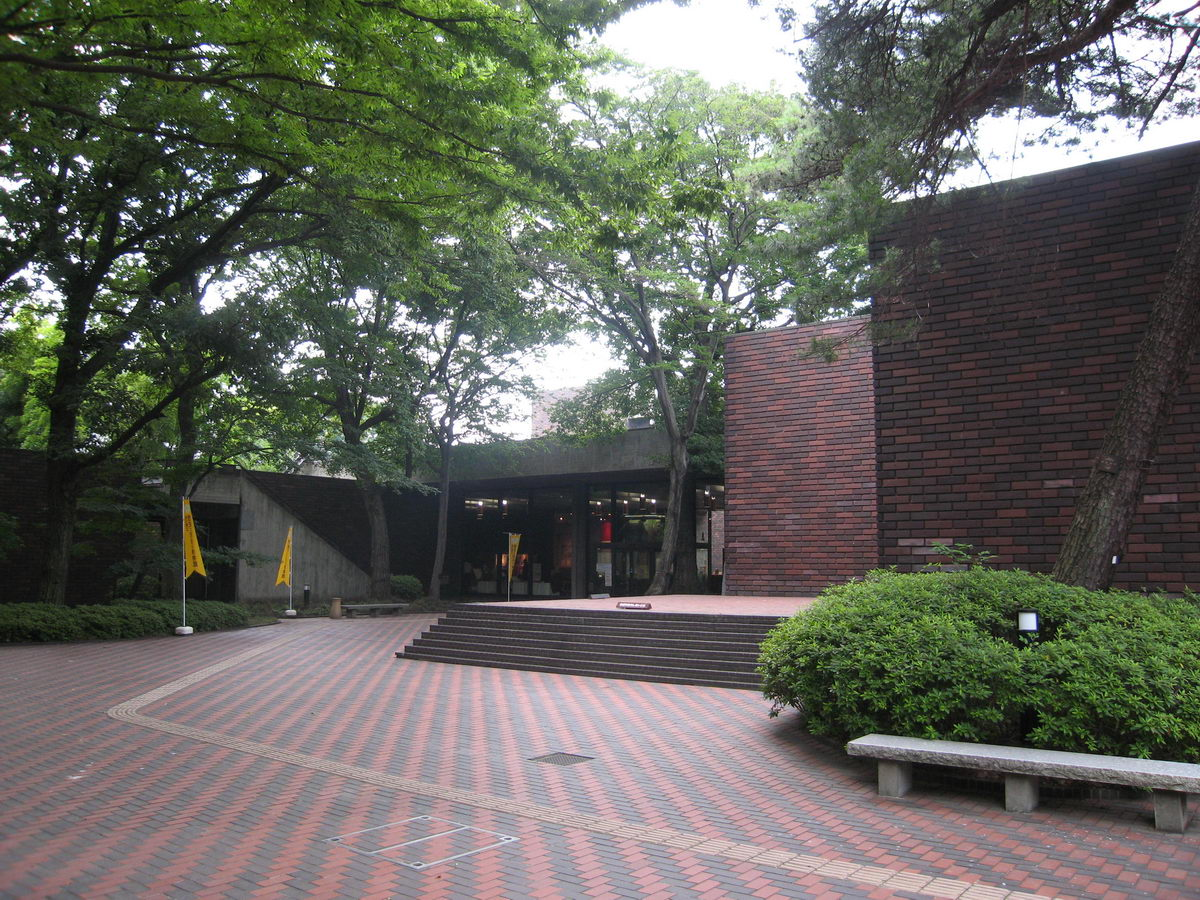
- Interactive map of the Saitama Prefectural Museum of History and Folklore area

General information
- Location: 4-219 Takahana-chō, Ōmiya-ku, Saitama, Saitama Prefecture, Japan
- Coordinates: 35°55′16″N 139°37′48″E
- Opened: 1971

Website
- homepage

Saitama Prefectural Museum of History and Folklore (埼玉県立歴史と民俗の博物館, Saitama Kenritsu Rekishi to Minzoku no Hakubutsukan) is a prefectural museum in Saitama, Japan, dedicated to the history and folklore of Saitama Prefecture. The museum opened in 1971.

== See also ==
- Chichibu Province
- Musashi Province
- List of Historic Sites of Japan (Saitama)
- List of National Treasures of Japan (crafts: swords)
