= Etchū Norishige =

Japanese swordsmith

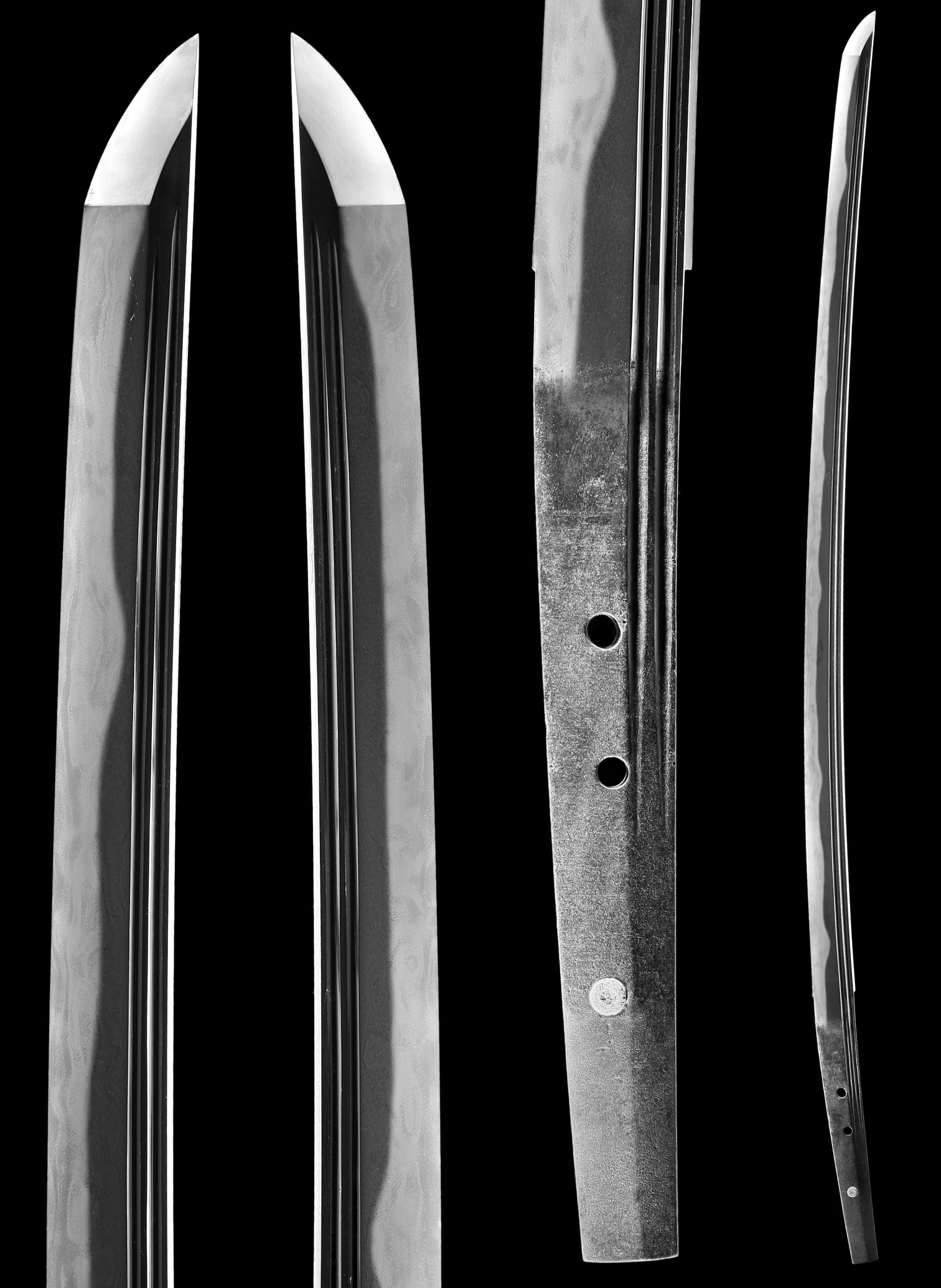
A Soshu school katana attributed to Etchu Norishige.

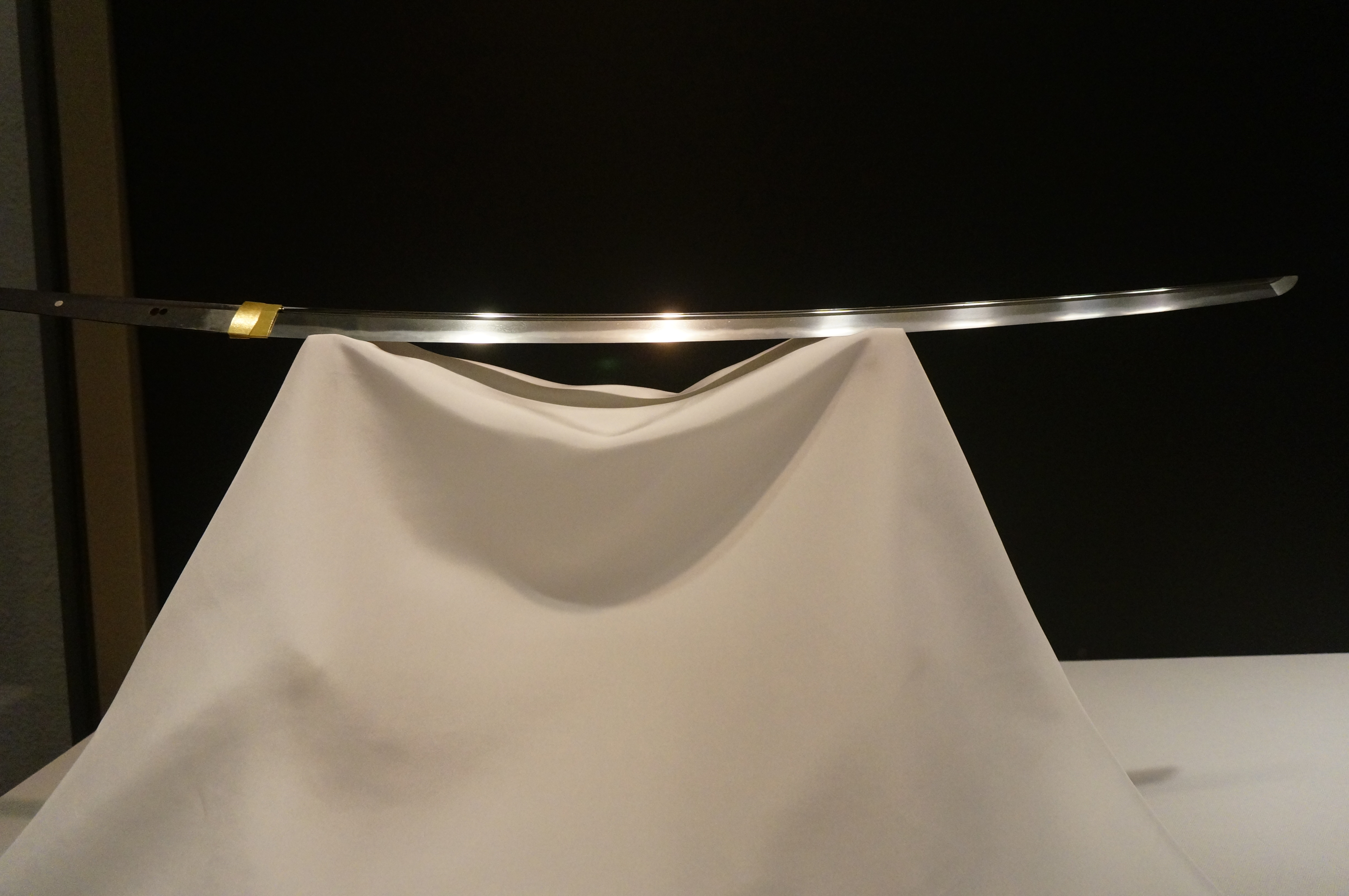
A tachi forged by Norishige. Kamakura period, 14th century

Etchū Norishige (則重; 1290–1366) was a Japanese swordsmith of the late Kamakura period. He was a contemporary and possibly a pupil of Masamune. His swords are noted for their distinct matsukawa hada 松皮肌 (pine bark grain). One of his works is classified as Kokuho (National Treasures) by the Ministry of Culture, the highest classification for a sword.

Norishige is regarded as one of the greatest Japanese swordsmiths in history. In the 14th century, he had a forge in the fief of Nei, present-day Toyama Prefecture. He made and supplied the finest katana to samurai in the Kamakura period.

== Katana Mumei Norishige ==
The Katana Mumei Norishige is designated as a national treasure of Japan. It was once the possession of Shimazu Narioki, 27th daimyō of the Shimazu clan and ruler of the Satsuma domain. Narioki gifted the katana to Kagoshima Shrine (鹿児島神宮). However, it went missing in the 20th century. It's believed to have been exported by Allied occupation forces after World War II.

In 2018, Norishige's katana was bought by Australian sword collector Ian Brooks from a seller in New York. The sword is unsigned, but it has the kanji 島神社 which matches Kagoshima Shrine and cataloging numbers on the scabbard wrapping that match the shrine's records. Ian Brooks stated he intends to have the sword returned to Kagoshima Shrine after his death.

== See also ==
- List of National Treasures of Japan (crafts: swords)
