= Yamatorige =

Japanese sword

Yamatorige (山鳥毛; "feather of a copper pheasant"), equally known as Sanchōmō by its Sino-Japanese reading, is a tachi (Japanese greatsword) forged during the middle Kamakura period (13th century). The set of the blade and its koshirae (mountings) is a National Treasure of Japan. It was wielded by Uesugi Kagekatsu (1556–1623), a powerful warlord in the Sengoku period, and had been inherited by his clan.

== History ==
Yamatorige was forged during the middle Kamakura period (13th century).

According to Kanzan Sato, a nihontō (Japanese sword) appraiser and researcher, it was named so in order to honor the beauty of the tachi by likening it to the feather of a copper pheasant or the landscape of sunset mountains. In addition, Suiken Fukunaga, another nihontō appraiser/researcher, cites a theory written in Sourinji Denki (『双林寺伝記』) that the name came from the landscape of a wildfire. Fukunaga himself, however, remarks the wildfire theory is utterly dubious.

The tachi is one of the 35 swords favored by the warlord Uesugi Kagekatsu (1556–1623), an adopted son and the successor of the "God of War" Uesugi Kenshin. Later it had been inherited as one of the greatest heirlooms of the Yonezawa-Uesugi clan, the head of the Uesugi clans.

On March 29, 1952, the tachi was designated a National Treasure of Japan. Its koshirae (mountings) are a part of the designation as accessories to the blade.

In 2020, Setouchi City purchased yamatorige from an individual, which was then housed in the Bizen Osafune Japanese Sword Museum. The purchase cost was about 500 million yen (About $5 million).

== List of name variations ==
The official full name for the blade and its mountings designated by the Agency for Cultural Affairs is Tachi Mumei-Ichimonji (Yamatorige) Hitokuchi tsuketari Uchigatana-Goshirae (太刀 無銘一文字（山鳥毛） 一口 附 打刀拵; "An Unsigned Tachi by the Ichimonji School (Yamatorige) with Mountings for a Katana-Type Sword").

Markus Sesko, a researcher on Japanese swords, calls the sword Yamatorige-Ichimonji (山鳥毛一文字).

Due to both its ambiguous origin and the highly complex reading system for kanji characters, the sword has a wide variety of associated names.

- Yamatorige - kun'yomi (native reading) for the kanji characters 山鳥毛
- Yamadorige - a variant of native reading
- Sanchōmō - on'yomi (Sino-Japanese reading) for the same characters
- Sanshōmō - by characters written on a wooden plate co-inherited with this tachi
- Yamashōmō

== See also ==
- List of National Treasures of Japan (crafts-swords)

== Bibliography ==
- 岡野, 多郎松 (1958), 佐藤貫一 (ed.), 備山愛刀図譜 (in Japanese), 岡野多郎松
- 佐藤, 寒山 (1964), "上杉景勝御手選三十五腰", 武将と名刀 (in Japanese), 人物往来社
- 福永, 酔剣 (1993-11-20), 日本刀大百科事典 (in Japanese), vol. 5, 雄山閣出版, ISBN 4639012020
- 福永, 酔剣 (1969), 日本刀物語 続 (in Japanese), 雄山閣出版
- 文化庁 (1984-12-16), 工芸品 III, 国宝 (in Japanese), vol. 8, 毎日新聞社
