= Kurokawa Institute of Ancient Cultures =

Japanese research institute

- 黒川古文化研究所
- Established: October 1950
- Location: 14-50 Kurakuen Sanban-chō, Nishinomiya, Hyōgo Prefecture, Japan
- Coordinates: 34°45′45″N 135°18′33″E
- Website: Official website (ja)

The Kurokawa Institute of Ancient Cultures (黒川古文化研究所, Kurokawa Kobunka Kenkyūjo) is a private research institute in Hyōgo Prefecture, Japan that preserves, researches, publishes, and exhibits materials relating to the arts, crafts, archaeology, history, and cultures of East Asia, in particular China and Japan. Established in 1950, the Institute relocated from Ashiya to Nishinomiya in 1974. The collection numbers some 8,500 works (20,000 individual items).

== See also ==
- List of National Treasures of Japan (crafts: swords)
