= Tsurugi (sword) =

Japanese sword

Tsurugi/Ken (剣)
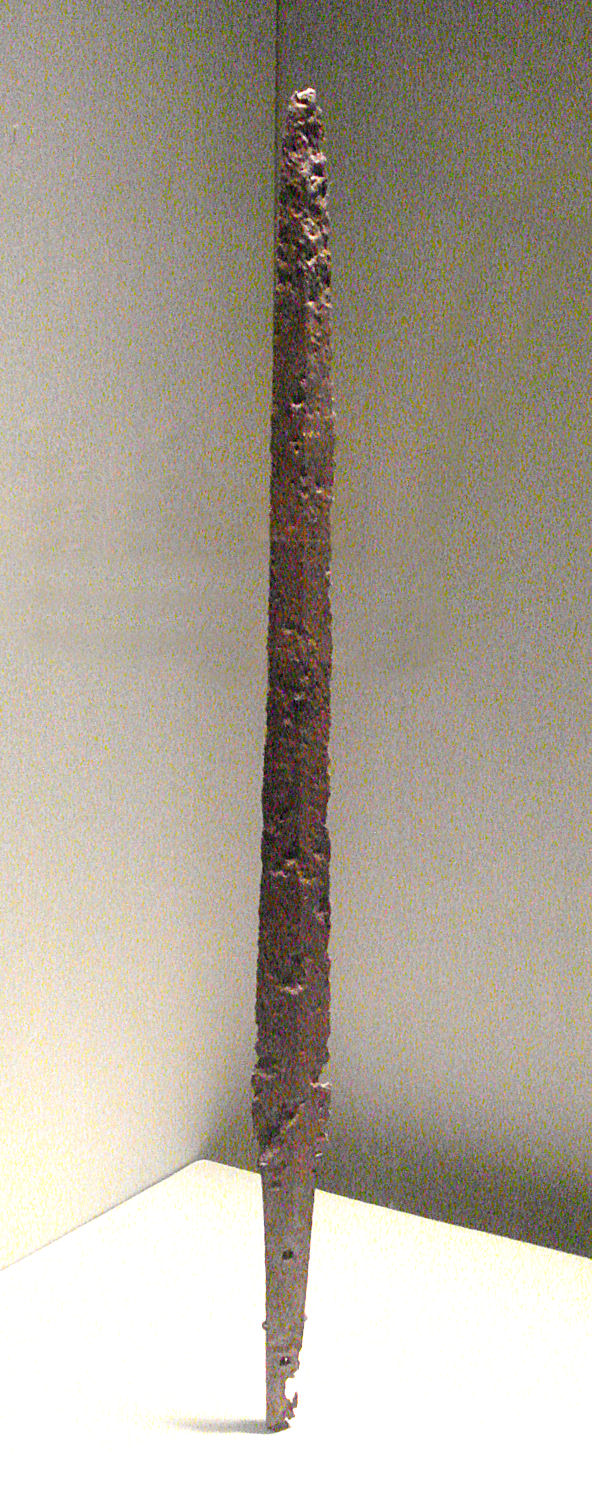
- A tsurugi double-edged straight sword from the Kofun period (5th century)
- Type: Sword
- Place of origin: Japan

Service history
- Used by: Samurai, Onna-musha

Production history
- Produced: Yayoi period ~ Heian period

Specifications
- Blade length: approx. 100 cm (39 in)
- Blade type: Straight, double-edged
- Hilt type: Metal, wood
- Scabbard/sheath: Lacquered wood

A tsurugi (剣) or ken (剣) is a straight, double-edged Japanese sword used in antiquity (as opposed to curved, single-edged swords such as the katana). In Japanese the term tsurugi or ken (ja:剣) is also used as a generic term for any kind of long, double-edged sword.

== History ==
The term tsurugi (剣) designates a straight, double-edged, bladed weapon from Japan. It is a sword with two cutting edges, one on each side of its blade, unlike the tachi, katana, wakizashi, or ōdachi, which have only one cutting edge on one side of the blade.

The oldest bronze sword excavated in Japan is a Chinese-style dagger from around 800 BCE in the Yayoi period (1000 BCE – 300 CE). A large number of bronze tsurugi made around 200 BCE in the Yayoi period were excavated from several sites, and it is thought that tsurugi were mass-produced in Japan in this period. Bronze tsurugi of this period were primarily used in religious ceremonies. The Yayoi was the transition period from bronze to iron. However, iron tsurugi were usually forged from the 5th century (Kofun period) to the 9th century (Heian period).

From the 10th century, the development of the curved tachi began, from which the katana emerged. For a long time, tsurugi were made as weapons or for religious services, but after the 10th century, they completely disappeared as weapons and came to be made only as offerings to shrines and Buddhist temples. One of the most famous tsurugi was made in the Heian period (794－1185); it belongs to Kongō-ji and is stored by Kyoto National Museum. It is made to imitate the sword of the Buddhist deity Fudo Myōō holds in his right hand, and the hilt is in the shape of a vajra, an altar tool.

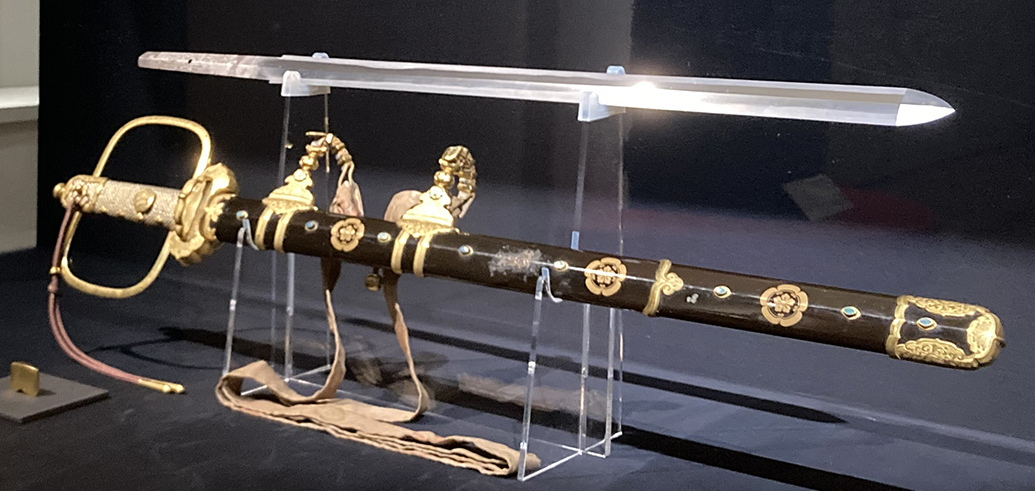
The tsurugi forged by Fujiwara Kunimichi in 1654 during the Edo period. It was made into an offering to Susanoo, the main enshrined kami of Yasaka Shrine.

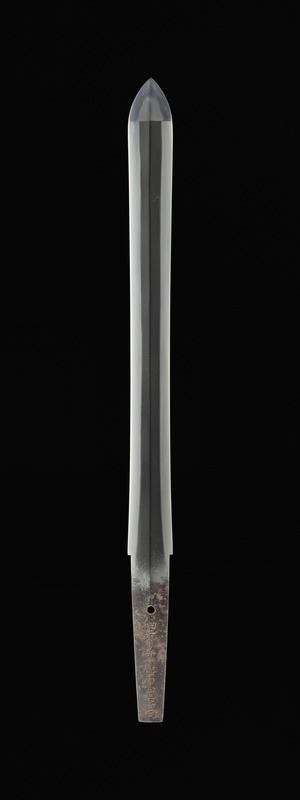
Tsurugi forged by Fujiwara Nobutaka. 17th century, Edo period. Kyushu National Museum

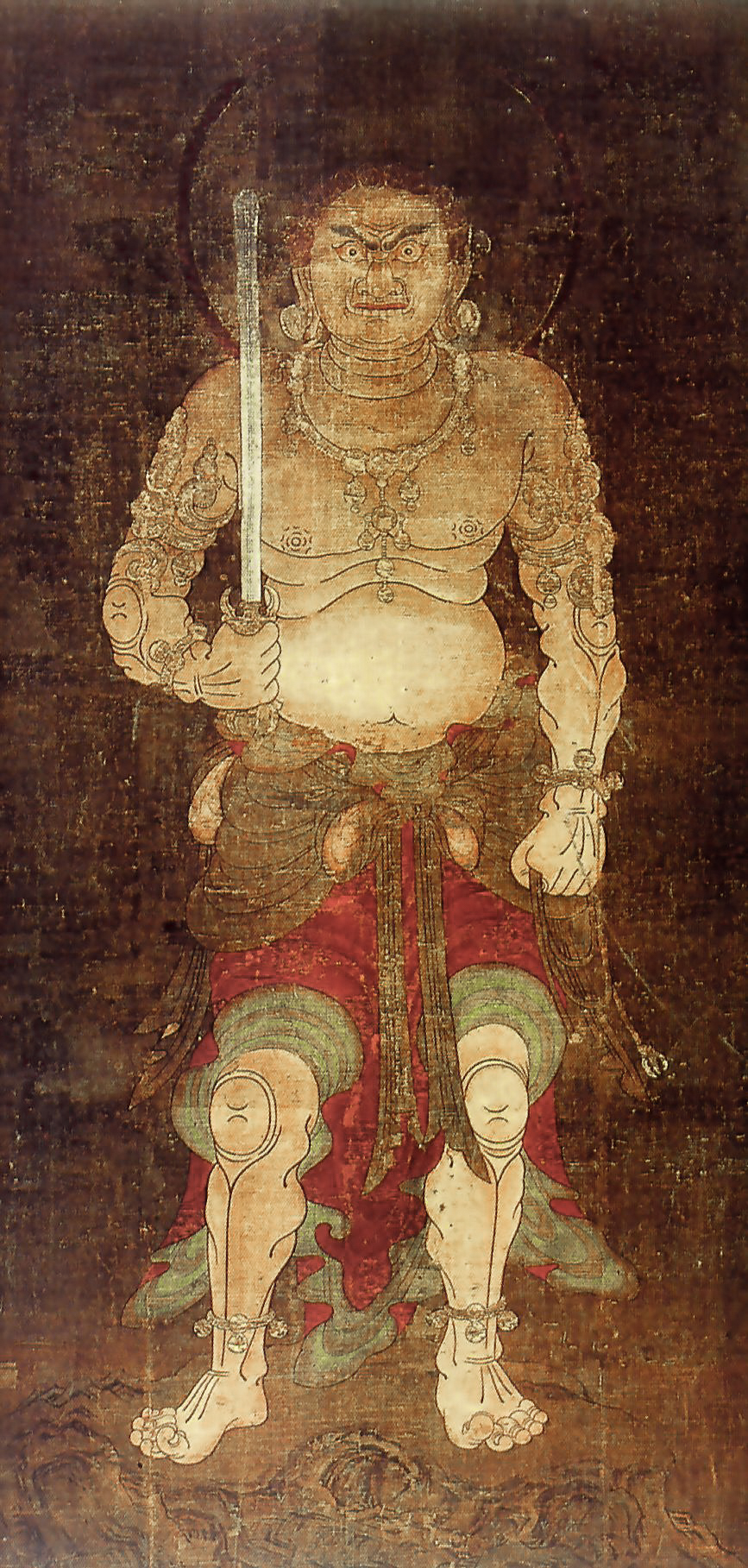
An example of Fudō Myōō with a sword. 12th century, Heian period. Manshu-in, Kyoto

Today, the tsurugi is primarily associated with distant historical periods and with legend and myth. There are some similarities with some variants of jian, the chugokuken (中国剣).

== Kusanagi-no-Tsurugi ==
The most famous example is the legendary sword Kusanagi no Tsurugi which is one of the Three Imperial Regalia of Japan.

== Tsurugi-tachi ==
The tsurugi-tachi (剣太刀), a straight sword with only one side of the blade sharpened throughout, was similar to the tsurugi or ken. The other (back) side was only worked into a second cutting edge in the front part near the tip.

== Literature ==
- Toshiro Suga: Ken, die Wurzeln des Aikido / Ken, les racines de l'Aïkido (DVD). Hagenow Ondefo-Verl., 2006, ISBN 978-3-939703-40-2.

== See also ==
- Japanese sword mountings
