= Shintōgo Kunimitsu =

Shintōgo Kunimitsu (新藤五国光) was a Japanese swordsmith and was especially famous for making Tantō. He is the founder of the Soshu-den tradition. Usually he used suguha Hamon. The oldest date of his work is 1293. He was active during the Einin, Shōwa and Enkyō periods, generally acknowledged to be the teacher of master swordsmiths Masamune, Yukiimitsu and Norishige. This is due to various similarities in style and workmanship that indicate that Masamune was almost certainly his student.

An example of his work is known as 'Aizu Shintogo'. It is a tanto of 25.4 centimeters in length.

He had several sons, who likely crafted a number of swords under his name.

Tantō by Shintōgo Kunimitsu
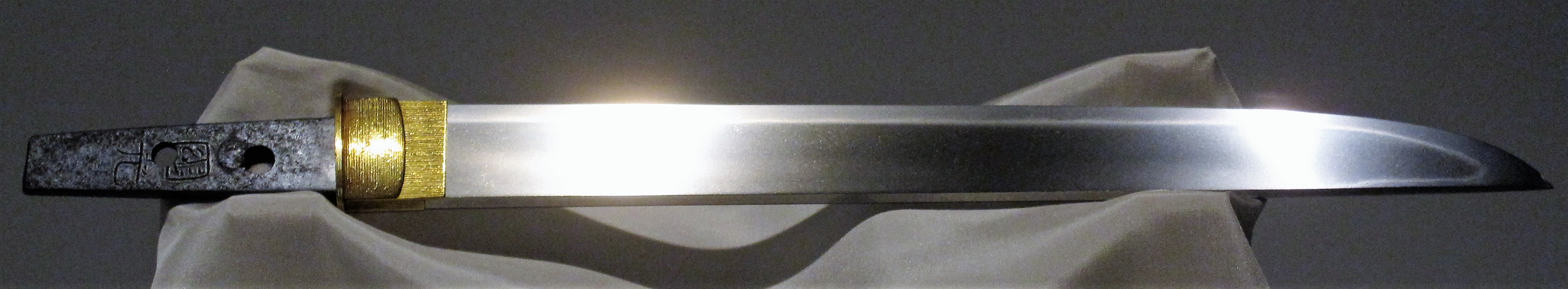
Tantō blade on display at the Tokyo National Museum. Important Cultural Property.

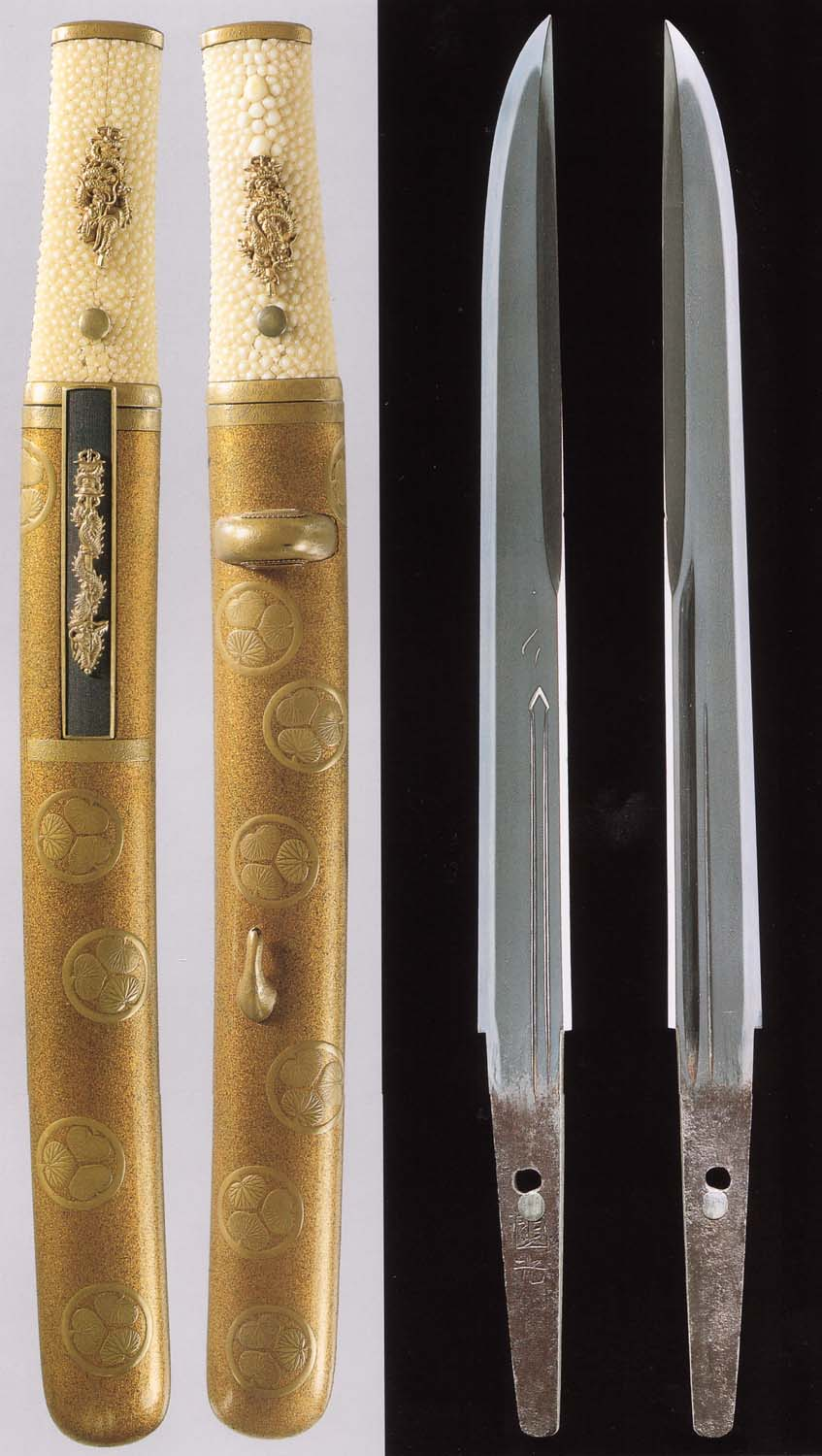
Tantō blade and mounting, on display at the Sano Art Museum. Important Cultural Property.

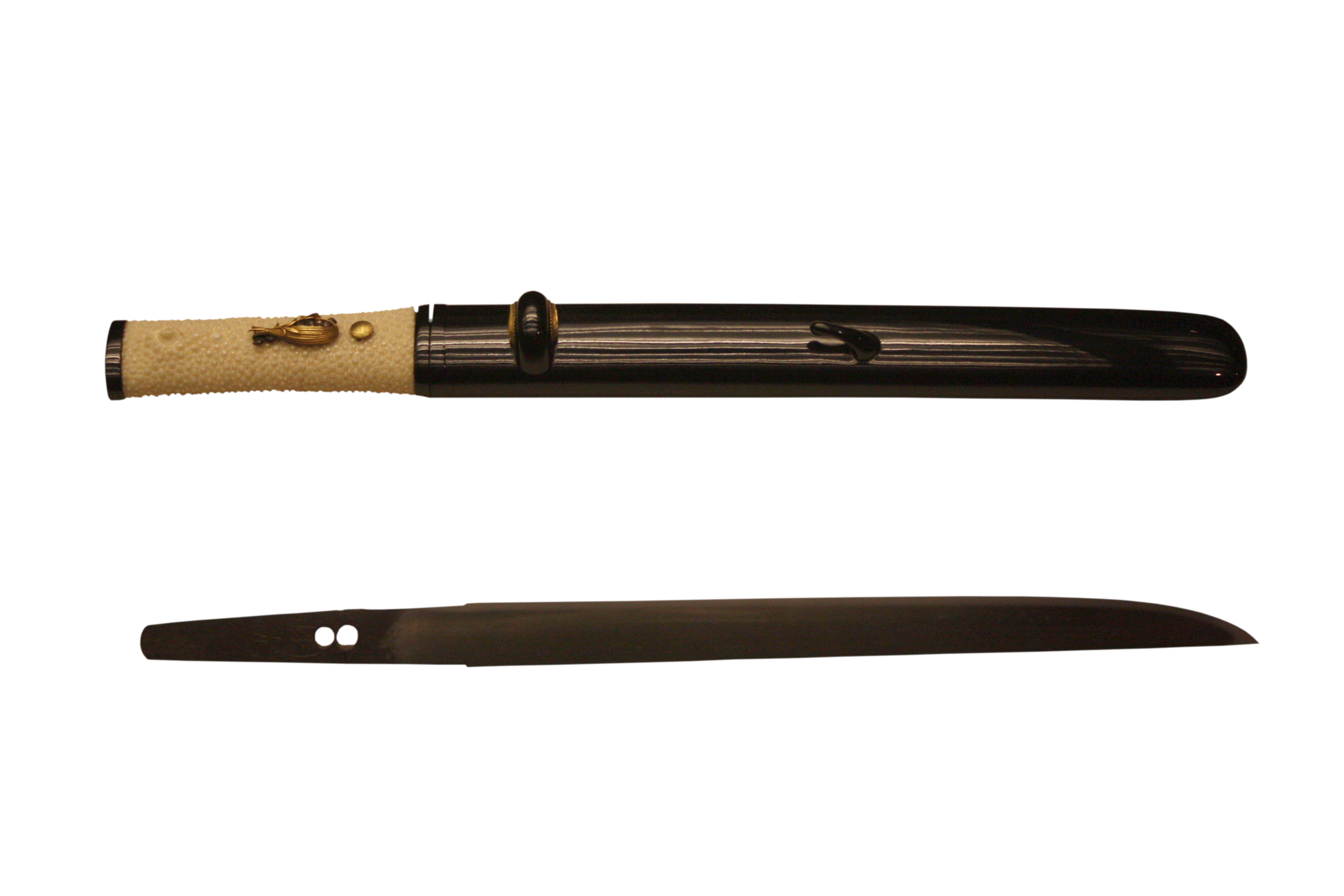
Tantō blade and mounting, on display at the British Museum
