= List of museums in Japan =

This is a list of museums in Japan.

As of October 2018, there were 5,738 museums in Japan. This total comprises, in line with the Museum Act, 914 registered museums, 372 designated museum-equivalent facilities, and 4,452 museum-like facilities.

== By region and prefecture ==
=== Hokkaidō ===
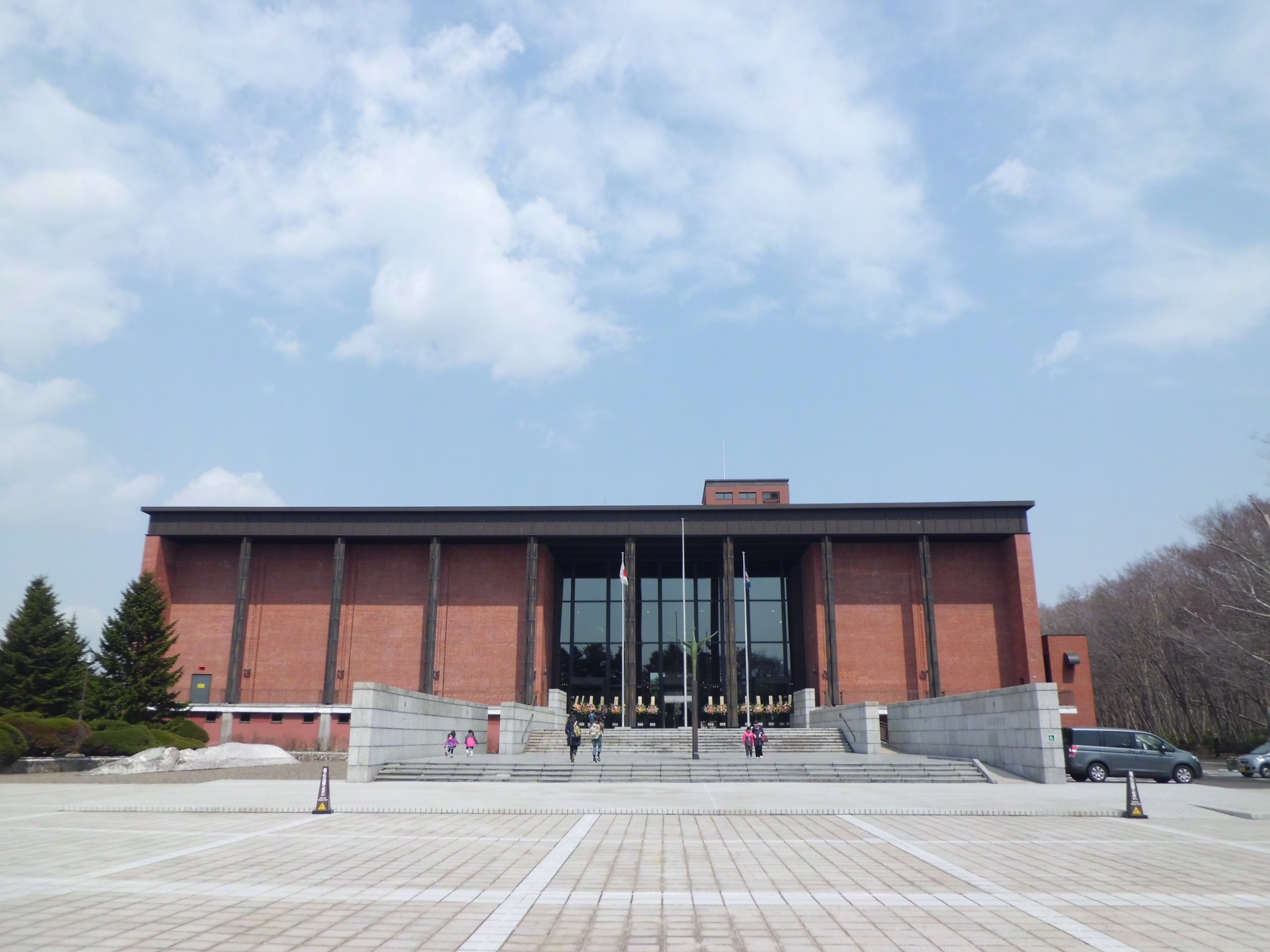
Hokkaidō Museum

==== Registered museums ====
As of 1 November 2019, and in line with the Museum Act, there were forty-five registered museums in Hokkaidō:

- Abashiri City Folk Museum
- Abashiri City Museum of Art
- Abashiri Prison Museum
- Akkeshi Maritime Affairs Memorial Museum
- Arai Memorial Museum of Art
- Asahikawa City Museum
- Asahikawa Museum of Sculpture in Honour of Nakahara Teijirō
- Asahikawa Science Center
- Bihoro Museum
- Date City Museum of History and Culture
- Hakodate City Museum
- Hakodate Jōmon Culture Center
- Hakodate Museum of Art, Hokkaidō
- Hidaka Mountains Museum
- Hiroo Town Marine Museum
- Hokkaidō Asahikawa Museum of Art
- Hokkaidō Museum of Literature
- Hokkaidō Museum of Modern Art
- Hokkaidō Museum of Northern Peoples
- Hokkaidō Obihiro Museum of Art
- Kan Yasuda Sculpture Museum – Arte Piazza Bibai
- Kitaichi Venetian Art Museum
- Kitami Region Museum of Science History and Art
- Kushiro Art Museum, Hokkaidō
- Kushiro City Museum
- Kushiro City Museum of Art
- Migishi Kōtarō Museum of Art, Hokkaidō
- Mikasa City Museum
- Miura Ayako Literature Museum
- Monbetsu City Museum
- Mukawa Town Hobetsu Museum
- Nayoro City Kitaguni Museum
- Nibutani Ainu Culture Museum
- Obihiro Centennial City Museum
- Otaru City General Museum
- Otaru City Museum of Art
- Otaru City Museum of Literature
- Rishiri Town Museum
- Sapporo Science Center
- Shibetsu City Museum
- Shinhidaka Town Museum
- Tomakomai Art Museum
- Tomakomai City Science Center
- Urakawa Town Museum
- Shiretoko Museum

==== Designated museum-equivalent facilities ====
As of 10 February 2015, in line with the Museum Act, there were twenty-one designated museum-equivalent facilities in Hokkaidō:

- Akkeshi Marine Station Field Science Center for Northern Biosphere, Hokkaidō University
- Asahikawa Tondenhei Village Museum
- Chitose Salmon Aquarium
- Field Science Center for Northern Biosphere, Hokkaidō University
- Fukuhara Memorial Museum
- Historical Village of Hokkaidō
- Hongō Shin Memorial Museum of Sculpture, Sapporo
- Kushiro Children's Museum
- Lake Utonai Sanctuary Nature Center
- Muroran City Youth Science Museum
- Muroran Folklore and Historic Museum
- Nemuro City Museum of History and Nature
- Noboribetsu Marine Park Nixe
- Noboribetsu Bear Park
- Obihiro Zoo
- Otaru Aquarium
- Sapporo Art Museum
- Sapporo Maruyama Zoo
- Sendai Clan, Shiraoi Manor House Museum
- Kanda Nisshō Memorial Museum of Art
- Yūbari Coal Mine Museum

==== Museum-like facilities, etc. ====
These include:

- Chūrui Naumann Elephant Museum
- Edwin Dun Memorial Museum
- Ebetsu City Historical Museum
- Ebetsu Glass Crafts Museum
- Eniwa City Historical Museum
- Esashi Town Historical Museum
- Hakodate City Museum of Literature
- Hakodate City Museum of Northern Peoples
- Historical Museum of the Saru River
- Hokkaidō Archaeological Operations Center
- Hokkaidō Museum
- Hokkaidō Railway Technology Museum
- Hokkaidō University Botanical Gardens
- Hokkaidō University Museum
- Hokuchin Memorial Museum
- Hokuto City Hometown Museum
- Ishikari City Hamamasu Folk Museum
- Kayano Shigeru Nibutani Ainu Museum
- Kikonai Town Museum
- Kitami Mint Memorial Museum
- Matsumae Town Historical Museum
- Miyanomori Art Museum
- Museum of Soils and Ploughs of the World
- Nanae Historical Museum
- National Ainu Museum
- Okhotsk Museum Esashi
- Otaru Music Box Museum
- Pierson Memorial House
- Rausu Municipal Museum
- Rebun Town Historical Museum
- Sapporo Beer Museum
- Sapporo Buried Cultural Property Center
- Shellfish Museum of Rankoshi
- Shibetsu Salmon Science Museum
- Shinhidaka Ainu Museum
- Shintotsukawa Town Historical Museum
- Taiho Sumo Museum
- Takikawa Local History Museum
- Takikawa Museum of Art and Natural History
- Urahoro Town Museum
- Wakkanai Karafuto Museum
- Yakumo Town Museum
- Yasushi Inoue Memorial Hall
- Yoichi Fisheries Museum

==== Former museums ====
Former museums include:

- Ainu Museum

=== Tōhoku ===
==== Aomori Prefecture ====
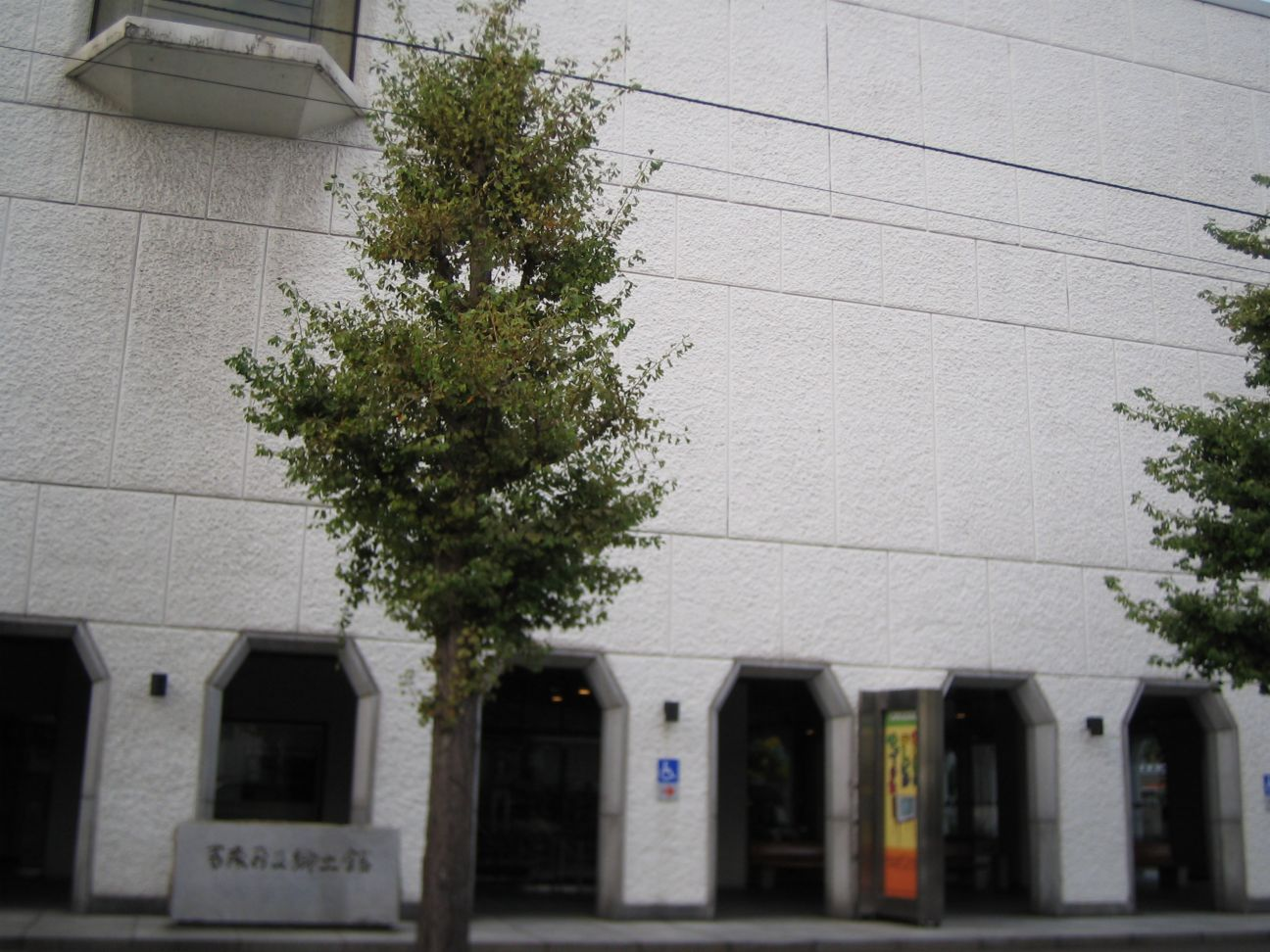
Aomori Prefectural Museum

===== Registered museums =====
As of 31 March 2020, in line with the Museum Act, there were three registered museums in Aomori Prefecture:

- Aomori Prefectural Museum
- Hachinohe City Museum
- Hirosaki City Museum

===== Designated museum-equivalent facilities =====
As of 31 March 2020, in line with the Museum Act, there was one designated museum-equivalent facility in Aomori Prefecture:

- Aomori Museum of Art

===== Museum-like facilities =====
As of 31 March 2020, and as listed by the Aomori Prefectural Government, there were eighty-four museum-like facilities in Aomori Prefecture, including:

- Aomori City Forestry Museum
- Aomori City Mediaeval Museum (Chūsei no Yakata)
- Aomori Museum of History
- Hakkōda Mountains Incident Museum
- Hirosaki Castle Botanical Gardens
- Hirosaki Castle Museum
- Hirosaki City Local Literature Museum
- Korekawa Archaeological Institution (Korekawa Jōmon Kan)
- Kushihiki Hachiman-gū Museum of National Treasures
- Dazai Osamu Memorial Museum
- Misawa Aviation & Science Museum
- Munakata Shikō Memorial Museum of Art
- Sanmaru Museum
- Takayama Uichi Memorial Museum of Art
- Terayama Shūji Memorial Museum
- Takaoka no Mori Historical Museum of Hirosaki Clan
- Towada Art Center
- Tsugaru-han Neputa Village
- Tsugaru Kokeshi Museum

===== Other related facilities =====
- Andō Shōeki Museum
- Nebuta Museum Wa Rasse
- Nitobe Memorial Museum
- Tachineputa Museum

===== Former museums =====
- Hachinohe City Museum of Art

==== Iwate Prefecture ====
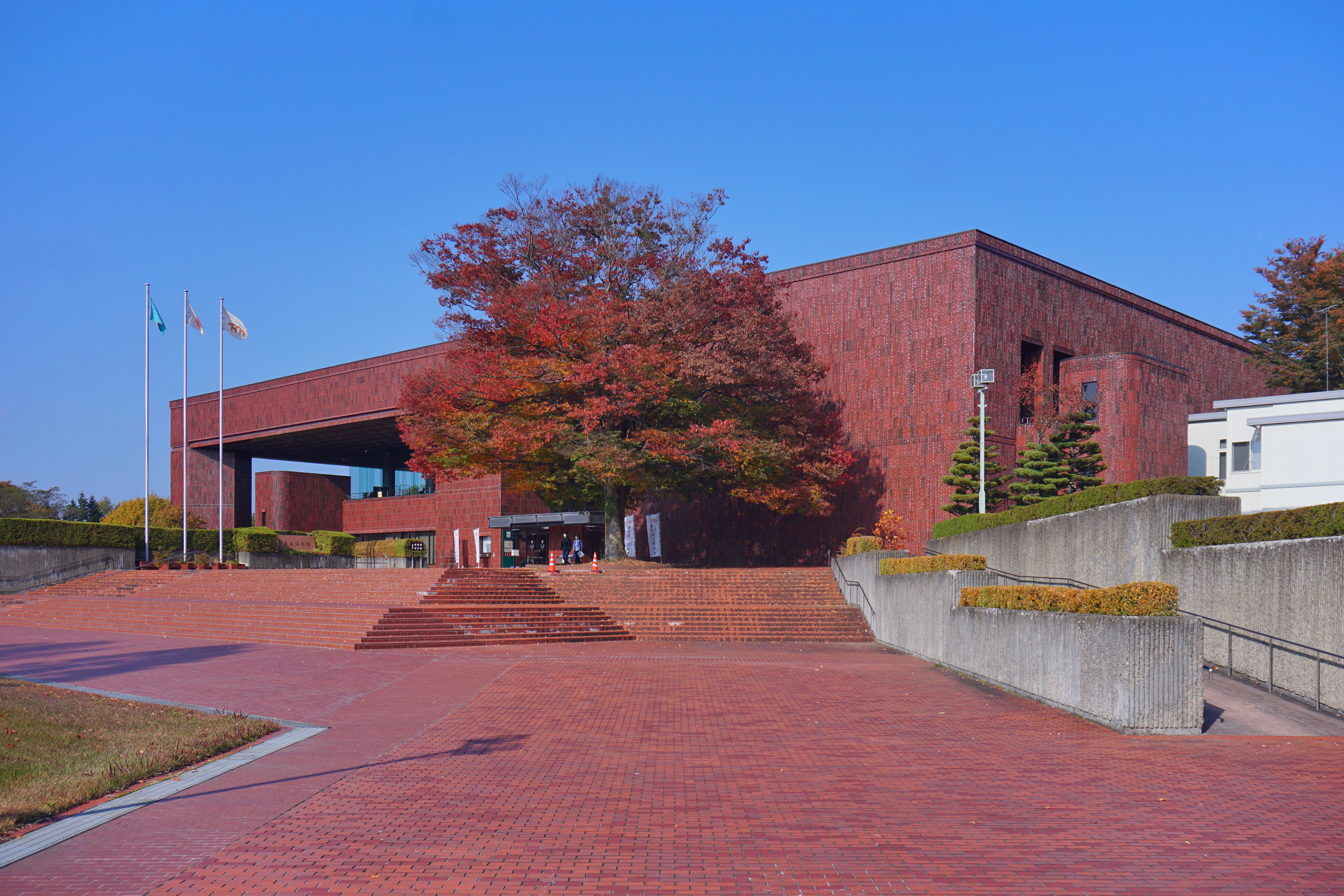
Iwate Prefectural Museum

===== Registered museums and designated museum-equivalent facilities =====
- Goshono Jōmon Museum
- Hanamaki City Museum
- Hekishōji Museum
- Iwate Museum of Art
- Iwate Prefectural Museum
- Kitakami City Museum
- Miyazawa Kenji Memorial Museum
- Ōfunato City Museum
- Ōshū City Cattle Museum
- Tōno City Museum

===== Museum-like facilities, etc =====
- Hachimantai City Museum
- Satō Hachirō Memorial Museum
- Hanamaki City Museum of History and Folklore
- Hara Kei Memorial Museum
- Ichinoseki City Museum
- Ishikawa Takuboku Memorial Museum
- Kikuta Kazuo Memorial Museum
- Michinoku Folk Village
- Mifune Kyūzō Memorial Museum
- Morioka History and Culture Museum
- Stone and Kenji Museum
- Toneyama Kōjin Memorial Art Museum
- Tōno Folktale Museum

==== Miyagi Prefecture ====
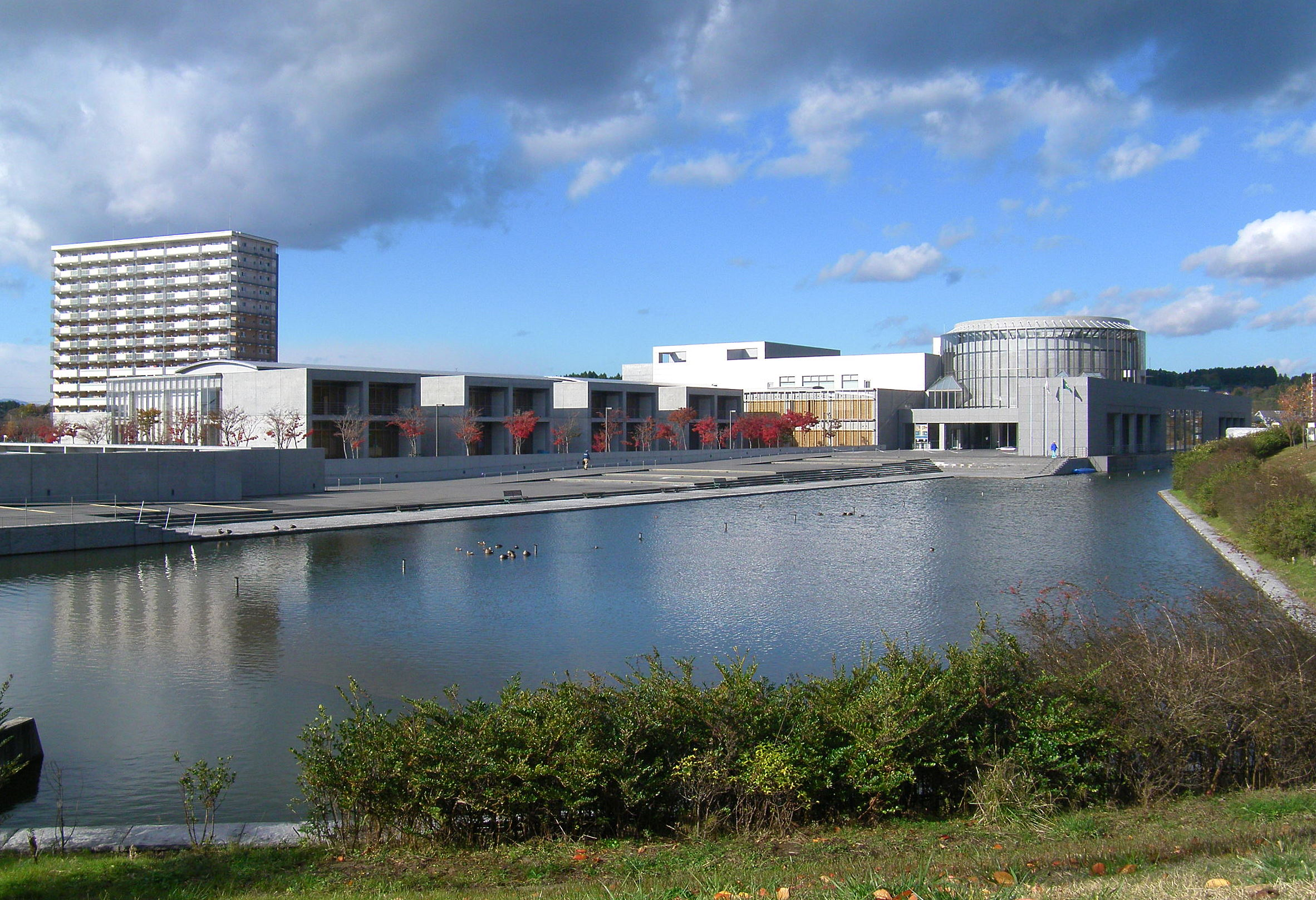
Tōhoku History Museum

===== Registered museums and designated museum-equivalent facilities =====
- Aoba Castle Museum
- Fukushima Art Museum
- The Miyagi Museum of Art
- Ōsaki City Matsuyama Furusato History Museum
- Rias Ark Museum of Art
- Rikuzentakata City Museum
- Sendai City Museum
- Kami Town Serisawa Chōsuke Tōhoku Ceramic Culture Museum
- Tōhoku Gakuin University Museum
- Tōhoku History Museum
- Tōhoku Fukushi University Serizawa Keisuke Art and Craft Museum
- Zuigan-ji Treasure Hall Seiryūden

===== Museum-like facilities, etc =====
- 3M Sendai Science Museum
- Bansui Sōdō
- Botanical Garden of Tōhoku University
- Daigigakoi Shell Mound Museum
- Fujita Kyōhei Museum of Glass
- Hara Asao Memorial Museum
- Ishinomori Manga Museum
- Ishinomori Shōtarō Furusato Memorial Museum
- Kankaku Museum
- Kanno Museum of Art
- Kanrantei & Matsushima Museum
- Kazenosawa Museum
- Kesennuma City Ōtani Mine History Museum
- Museum of Kamei Collection
- Nakamoto Seishi Contemporary Art Museum
- Ōhira-mura Furusato Museum of Art
- Police Museum
- Saitō Garden Museum
- Sannō-Gakoi Site Museum
- Satohama Shell Mound & Historical Museum of Jōmon Village, Oku-Matsushima
- Satoru Satō Art Museum
- Sendai Astronomical Observatory
- Sendai City Tomizawa Site Museum
- Sendai City War Reconstruction Memorial Hall
- Sendai City Wild Plants Garden
- Sendai Kaleidoscope Museum
- Sendai Literature Museum
- Shiogama Jinja Museum
- Shiogama Sugimura Jun Museum of Art
- Tanabata Museum
- Tōhoku University Museum
- Tome City History Museum
- Toyoma Education Museum
- Zuihōden Museum

==== Akita Prefecture ====
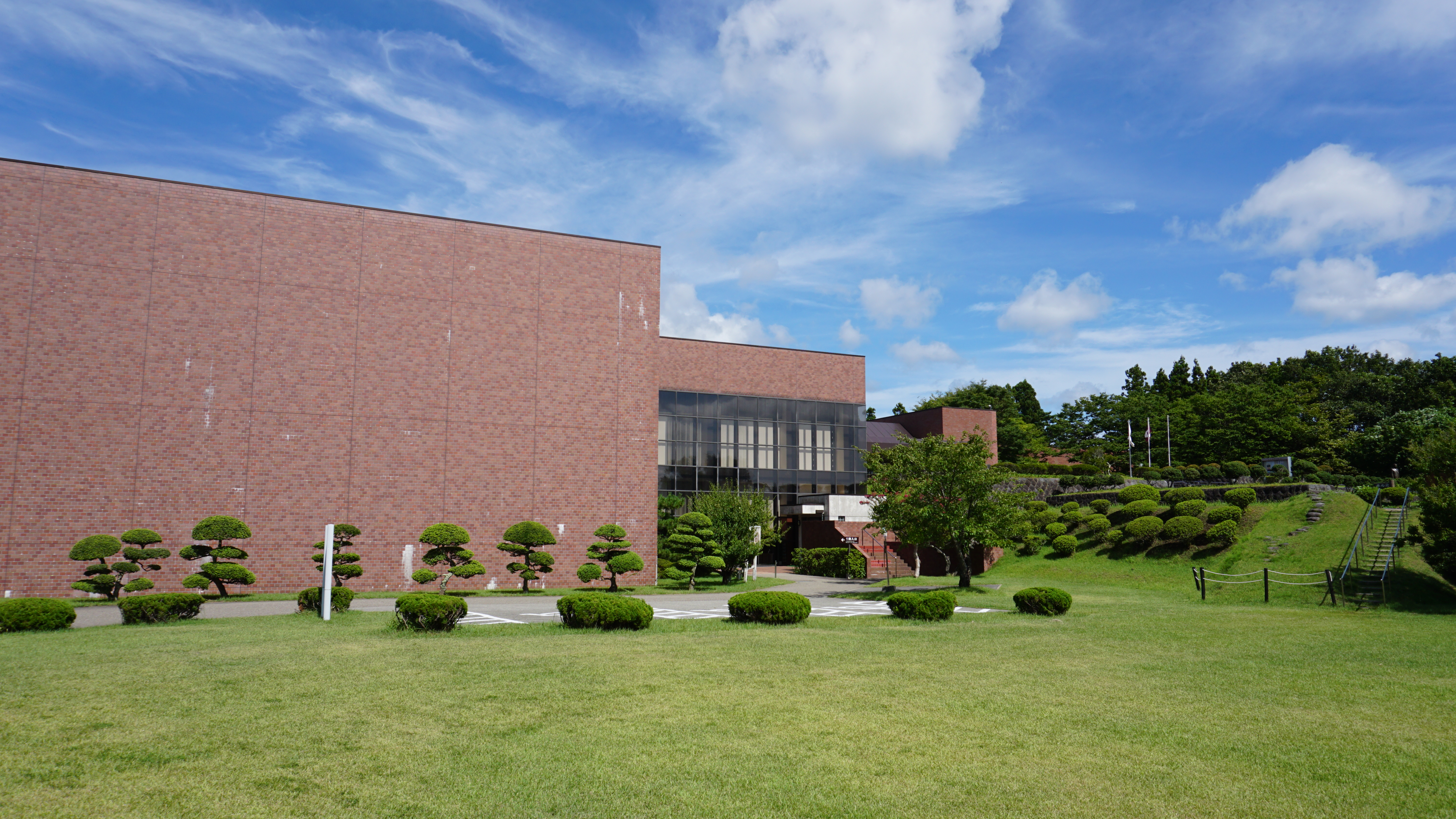
Akita Prefectural Museum

===== Registered museums and designated museum-equivalent facilities =====
- Akita Museum of Art
- Akita Museum of Modern Art
- Akita Prefectural Museum
- Akita Senshū Museum of Art
- Kitaakita City Hamabe no Uta Music Hall
- Kosaka Town Museum
- Omono River Local Museum
- Polder Museum of Ōgata-Mura

===== Museum-like facilities, etc =====
- Mining Museum of Akita University
- Ōmura Museum of Art
- Satake Historical Museum
- Yokote Masuda Manga Museum

==== Yamagata ====
- Abumiya
- Chidō Museum
- Chidōkan (Tsuruoka)
- Dewazakura Museum of Art
- Domon Ken Photography Museum
- Homma Museum of Art
- Kaminoyama Castle
- Matsuoka Kaikonjo
- Mogami Yoshiaki Historical Museum
- Sakata City Museum of Art
- Yamadera Basho Memorial Museum
- Yamagata Museum of Art
- Yamagata Prefectural Museum
- Yonezawa City Uesugi Museum

==== Fukushima ====
- Aizuwakamatsu Castle
- Fukushima Museum
- Fukushima Prefectural Museum of Art
- Iwaki City Archaeological Museum
- Kōriyama City Museum of Art
- Morohashi Museum of Modern Art
- Picture Book Museum, Iwaki City
- Takizawa Honjin

=== Kantō ===
==== Ibaraki ====
- Ibaraki Prefectural Museum of History
- Science Museum of Map and Survey
- Tenshin Memorial Museum of Art, Ibaraki
- Geological Museum (Japan)
- Tsukuba Space Center

==== Tochigi ====
- Bandai Museum
- Honda Collection Hall
- Kurita Museum
- Utsunomiya Museum of Art
- Tochigi Prefectural Museum
- Tochigi Prefectural Museum of Fine Arts

==== Gunma ====
- Asama Volcano Museum
- Gunma Insect World
- The Museum of Modern Art, Gunma
- Okawa Museum of Art
- Usui Pass Railway Heritage Park

==== Saitama ====
- Hachigata Castle
- John Lennon Museum
- Railway Museum (Saitama)
- Saitama Prefectural Museum of the Sakitama Ancient Burial Mounds
- Tokorozawa Aviation Museum

==== Chiba ====
- Chiba Museum of Science and Industry
- Hoki Museum
- Kawamura Memorial DIC Museum of Art
- Kururi Castle
- National Museum of Japanese History
- Ōtaki Castle (Chiba)
- Sekiyado Castle
- Tateyama Castle

==== Kanagawa ====
- Hakone Open-Air Museum
- Hara Model Railway Museum
- Japan Coast Guard Museum Yokohama
- Japanese battleship Mikasa
- Kamakura Museum of Literature
- Kamakura Museum of National Treasures
- Kanazawa Bunko
- Lalique Museum Hakone
- Museum of Tin Toys
- Nihon Minka-en
- Nissan Engine Museum
- Number Nine Research Laboratory
- NYK Maritime Museum
- Odawara Castle
- Pola Museum of Art
- Shin-Yokohama Raumen Museum
- Taro Okamoto Museum of Art
- Toshiba Science Institute
- Yamate Museum
- Yokohama Archives of History
- Yokohama Customs Museum
- Yokohama History Museum
- Yokohama Museum of Art
- Yokohama Port Museum
- Yokohama Science Center
- Yokohama Silk Museum

=== Chūbu ===
==== Niigata ====
- Former Niigata Customs House
- Joetsu aquarium
- Niigata City History Museum
- Niigata Prefectural Museum of History
- Northern Culture Museum

==== Toyama ====
- Museum of Modern Art, Toyama
- Toyama Castle

==== Ishikawa ====
- 21st Century Museum of Contemporary Art
- Ishikawa Aviation Plaza
- Ishikawa Nanao Art Museum
- Ishikawa Prefectural History Museum
- Ishikawa Prefectural Museum of Art
- Ishikawa Prefectural Museum of Traditional Arts and Crafts
- Kanazawa Phonograph Museum
- Kanazawa Yasue Gold Leaf Museum
- Kanazawa Yuwaku Yumeji-kan Museum
- Murō Saisei Memorial Museum
- Nippon Origami Museum
- Notojima Aquarium

==== Fukui ====
- Brief Messages from the Heart Museum
- Fukui Fine Arts Museum
- Fukui Prefectural Dinosaur Museum
- Fukui Prefectural Museum of Cultural History
- Fukui Prefectural Varve Museum
- Maruoka Castle
- Tsuruga Municipal Museum
- Port of Humanity Tsuruga Museum
- Wakasa Mikata Jōmon Museum

==== Yamanashi ====
- Kiyosato Museum of Photographic Arts
- Maizuru Castle Park
- Nakamura Keith Haring Collection
- Yamanashi Prefectural Museum
- Yamanashi Science Museum

==== Nagano ====
- Hijiri Museum
- Japan Ukiyo-e Museum
- Jōkyō Gimin Memorial Museum
- Kaichi School Museum
- Kitano Museum of Art
- Lake Nojiri Naumann Elephant Museum
- Matsumoto Castle
- Matsushiro Literary and Military School
- Saku Children's Science Dome for the Future
- Sunritz Hattori Museum of Arts
- Togariishi Museum of Jōmon Archaeology

==== Gifu ====
- Cormorant Fishing House
- Eizō & Tōichi Katō Memorial Art Museum
- Enkū Museum
- Gifu Castle
- Gifu City Museum of History
- Gifu City Science Museum
- Gifu Prefectural Museum
- Hida Minzoku Mura Folk Village
- Hikaru Memorial Hall
- Museum of Fine Arts, Gifu
- Nawa Insect Museum
- Ōgaki Castle
- Ōta-juku Nakasendō Museum
- Solar Ark
- Sunomata Castle

==== Shizuoka ====
- Arai Barrier
- Hamamatsu Castle
- Kakegawa Castle
- MOA Museum of Art
- Sano Art Museum
- Shijimizuka site
- Shizuoka Prefectural Museum of Art
- Toi Gold Museum
- Uehara Museum of Modern Art
- Yokosuka Castle

===== Former museums =====
- Sakuma Rail Park

==== Aichi ====
- Aichi Arts Center
- Aichi Prefectural Ceramic Museum
- Bank of Tokyo-Mitsubishi UFJ Money Museum
- Electricity Museum, Nagoya
- Hekinan aquarium
- Inuyama Castle
- International Design Centre Nagoya
- Iwasaki Castle
- Japan Spinning Top Museum
- Kiyosu Castle
- Koromo Castle
- Little World Museum of Man
- Masamura Pachinko Museum
- Meiji Mura
- Nagoya Castle
- Nagoya City Art Museum
- Nagoya City Museum
- Nagoya City Science Museum
- Nagoya City Tram & Subway Museum
- Nagoya Noh Theater
- Nagoya/Boston Museum of Fine Arts
- Nishio Castle
- Noritake Garden
- Okazaki Castle
- SCMaglev and Railway Park
- Tahara Castle
- Tokugawa Art Museum
- Toyohashi City Museum Art and History
- Toyota Automobile Museum
- Toyota Commemorative Museum of Industry and Technology
- Toyota Municipal Museum of Art
- Yoshida Castle

=== Kansai ===
==== Mie ====
- Chōkaidō Museum
- Iga Ueno Castle
- Iga-ryū Ninja Museum
- Natsumi Temple complex
- Sagawa Memorial Museum of Shinto and Japanese Culture, Kogakkan University
- Saikū

==== Shiga ====
- Hikone Castle
- Kawara Museum
- Miho Museum
- Minakuchi Castle
- Nagahama Castle
- Sagawa Art Museum
- Lake Biwa Museum

==== Kyoto ====
- Asahi beer Oyamazaki Villa Museum of Art
- Fukuchiyama Castle
- Koryo Museum of Art
- Kyoto Art Center
- Kyoto City History Museum
- Kyoto International Manga Museum
- Kyoto Municipal Museum of Art
- Kyoto Museum for World Peace
- Kyoto National Museum
- National Museum of Modern Art, Kyoto
- Nintendo Museum
- Ōkōchi Sansō
- Ryozen Museum of History
- Sen-oku Hakuko Kan
- The Tale of Genji Museum
- Umekoji Steam Locomotive Museum

==== Osaka ====
- Abeno Harukas Art Museum
- CupNoodles Museum Osaka Ikeda
- Fujita Art Museum
- Itsuō Art Museum
- Kishiwada Castle
- Kubosō Memorial Museum of Arts, Izumi
- Liberty Osaka
- Masaki Art Museum
- Modern Transportation Museum
- Momofuku Ando Instant Ramen Museum
- Museum of Oriental Ceramics, Osaka
- National Museum of Art, Osaka
- National Museum of Ethnology (Japan)
- Osaka Castle
- Osaka City Museum of Fine Arts
- Osaka Contemporary Art Center
- Osaka International Peace Center
- Osaka Maritime Museum
- Osaka Museum of History
- Osaka Museum of Natural History
- Osaka Prefectural Chikatsu Asuka Museum
- Osaka Science Museum
- Sakai City Museum
- Yuki Museum of Art

===== Former museums =====
- Osaka City Museum

==== Hyōgo ====
- Hakutsuru Fine Art Museum
- Hyōgo Prefectural Museum of Art
- Kobe Anpanman Children's Museum & Mall
- Kobe City Museum
- Kobe City Museum of Literature
- Kobe Maritime Museum
- Takenaka Carpentry Tools Museum

==== Nara ====
===== Registered museums =====
There are fourteen registered museums:

- The City Museum of Gojō Culture
- Daiki Osyou Folk Craft Museum
- Kashiba Municipal Nijōsan Museum
- Kashihara City Museum of History
- Kashihara City Museum of Insects
- Kasuga Taisha Kokuhōden
- Kasuga Taisha Manyō Botanical Garden
- Katsuragi City History Museum
- Kita Museum of Art
- The Museum, Archaeological Institute of Kashihara, Nara Prefecture
- Nakano Museum of Art
- Neiraku Museum
- Shōhaku Art Museum
- Suiheisha Museum

===== Museum-equivalent facilities =====
There are six museum-equivalent facilities:

- Hōryū-ji Daihōzōden
- The Museum of Tezukayama University
- The Museum Yamato Bunkakan
- Nara University Museum
- Takamatsuzuka Mural Hall
- Tenri University Sankōkan Museum

===== Other museums and museum-like facilities =====
- Asuka Historical Museum
- Irie Taikichi Memorial Museum of Photography Nara City
- Karako-Kagi Archaeological Museum
- Nara City Historical Materials Preservation House
- Nara Municipal Buried Cultural Properties Research Centre
- Nara National Museum
- Nara Palace Site Museum
- Nara Prefecture Complex of Man'yo Culture
- Nara Prefectural Museum of Art
- Nara Prefectural Museum of Folklore
- Tomimoto Kenkichi Memorial Museum

==== Wakayama ====
- Kushimoto Turkish Memorial and Museum
- Wakayama Castle
- Wakayama City Museum
- Wakayama Prefectural Museum
- Wakayama Prefecture Kii-fudoki-no-oka Museum of Archaeology and Folklore

=== Chūgoku ===
==== Tottori Prefecture ====
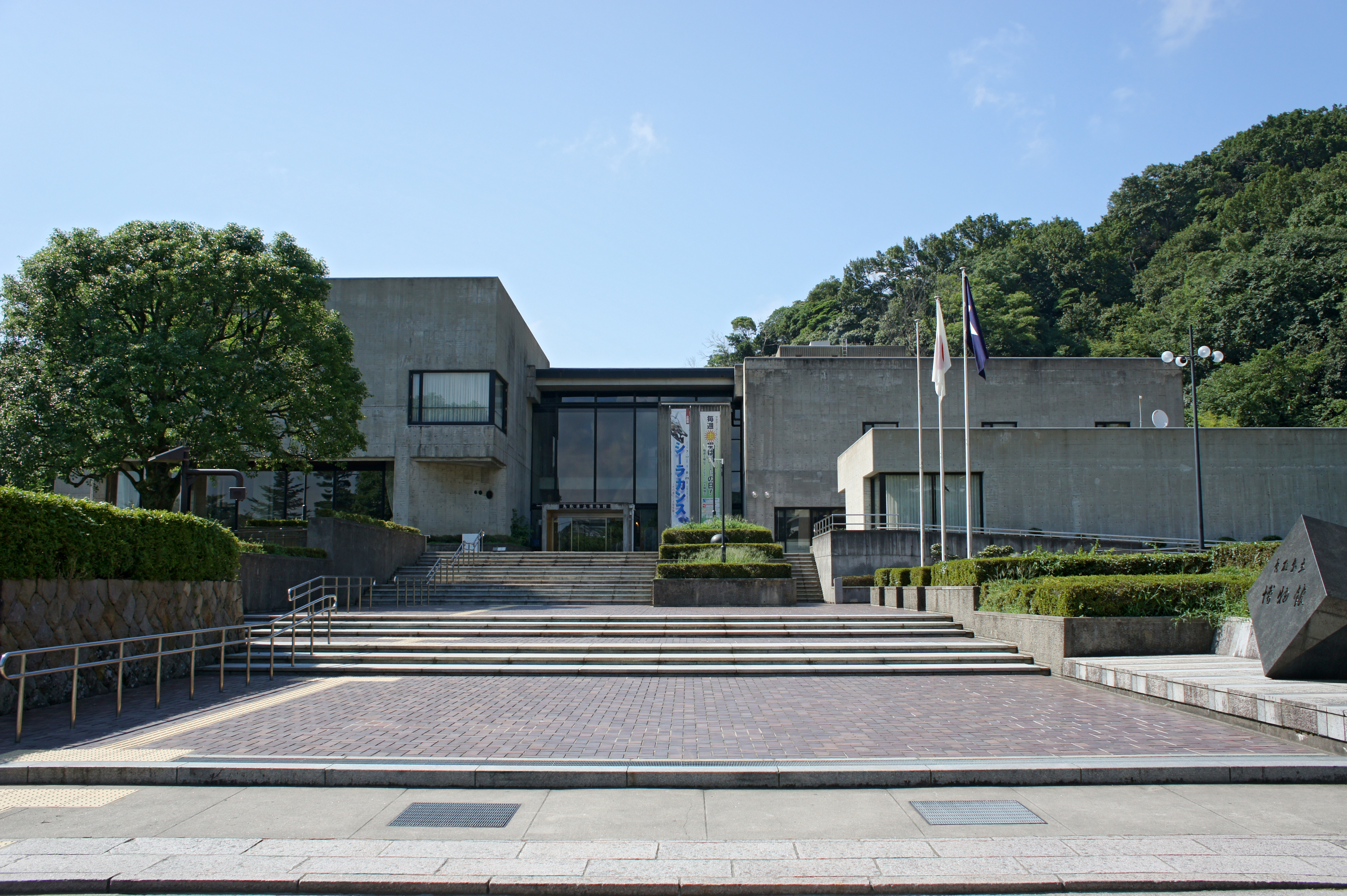
Tottori Prefectural Museum

===== Registered museums and designated museum-equivalent facilities =====
- Kurayoshi Museum
- Tottori City Historical Museum
- Tottori Folk Crafts Museum
- Tottori Prefectural Museum
- Watanabe Art Museum
- Yonago City Museum of Art

===== Museum-like facilities, etc =====
- Aoyakamiji Site Exhibition Hall
- Aoya Local Museum
- Aoyama Gōshō Furusatokan
- Aoya Washi Workshop
- Asia Museum - Inoue Yasushi Memorial Museum
- Chiisana Yume Art Museum
- Daisen-ji Hōmotsukan Reihōkaku
- Daisen Museum of Nature and History
- Enchō-en Chinese Garden
- Enkei Theater Kurayoshi Figure Museum
- Hiezu Village Folk Museum
- Hino Town Museum of History and Folklore
- Hōjō History and Folklore Museum
- Hōki Sangaku Art Museum
- Hyōnosen Nature Museum, Hibikinomori
- Ikemoto Yoshimi Little Museum Of Photography
- Inaba Man-yō History Pavilion
- Ishitani Residence
- Japan-Korea Friendship Museum
- Jinsho no Yakata
- Jinpūkaku
- Kameda Masakazu Memorial Museum
- Kamiyodo Hakuhō-no-Oka Exhibition Hall
- Kōfu Town Museum of History and Folklore
- Kotoura Lifelong Learning Center
- Kurayoshi Line Railway Memorial Museum
- Misasa Violin Museum
- Mizuki Shigeru Memorial Museum
- Mount Oshiroyama Observation Deck Kawahara Castle
- Nagashibina Doll Museum
- Nichinan Town Art Museum
- Nishikawa Katsumi Film Museum
- Saji Astro Park
- Mitokusan Sanbutsu-ji Treasure Hall
- Sand Museum
- San'in Kaigan Geopark Museum of the Earth and Sea
- Shiotani Teikō Memorial Photo Gallery
- Tottori College Kasuri Museum
- Tottori Hanakairō Flower Park
- Tottori Nijisseiki Pear Museum
- Tottori Prefectural Buried Cultural Property Center
- Tottori Prefectural Muki Banda Historic Site Park
- Ueda Shōji Museum of Photography
- Umi to Kurashi no Shiryōkan
- Wakasa Kyōdo Bunka-no-Sato
- Warabekan
- Yonago City Fukuichi Archaeology Museum
- Municipal Yonago Historical Museum
- Yonago San'in Historical Museum
- Yonago Waterbirds Sanctuary
- Yukamuri Gallery - Osaki Midori Museum
- Yumeminato Tower
- Yurihama Town Hawai History and Folklore Museum
- Yūsei Museum

==== Shimane ====
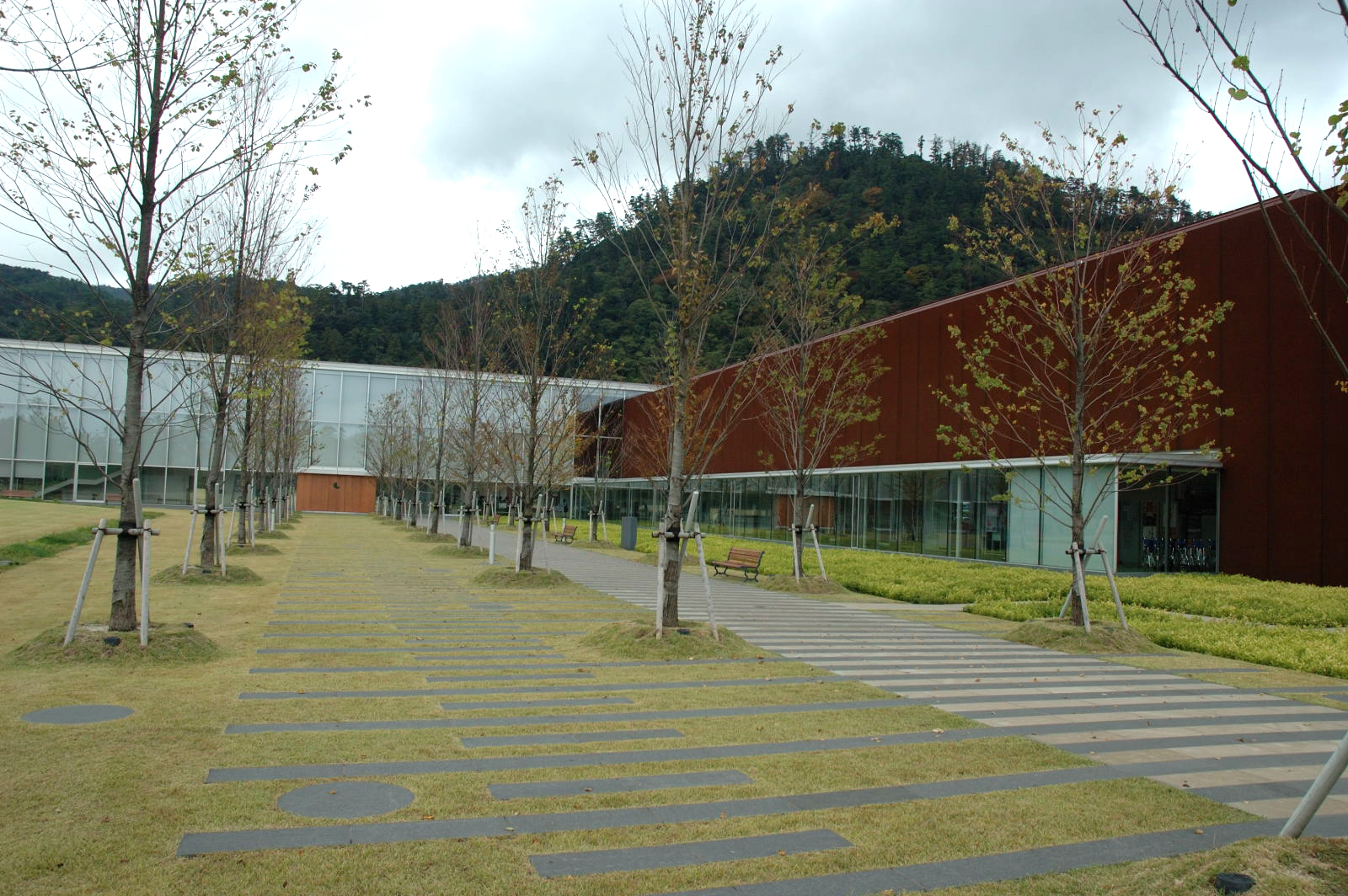
Shimane Museum of Ancient Izumo

===== Registered museums and designated museum-equivalent facilities =====
- Abe Eishirō Memorial Museum
- Adachi Museum of Art
- Hamada Children's Museum of Art
- Hirata Honjin Memorial Museum
- Imaoka Art Museum
- Itohara Memorial Museum
- Iwami Adachi Art Museum
- Iwami Art Museum
- Izumo Taisha Hōmotsuden
- Kabeya Shūseikan
- Kamei History Hall
- Kanō Art Museum
- Matsue History Museum
- Sekishō Art Museum
- Shimane Art Museum
- Shimane Museum of Ancient Izumo
- Tanabe Art Museum
- Tezen Museum
- Wakō Museum

===== Museum-like facilities, etc =====
- Ama Town Gotobain Museum
- Anno Mitsumasa Art Museum
- Hamada Local History Museum
- Hanzake Nature Museum of Mizuho
- Imai Museum
- Iwami Ginzan Museum
- Izumo Cultural Heritage Museum
- Izumo Folk Crafts Museum
- Izumo Science Center
- Izumo Tamatsukuri Museum
- Izumo Yayoi-no-Mori Museum
- Kōjindani Archaeological Museum
- Lafcadio Hearn Memorial Museum
- Matsue Castle
- Nakamura Hajime Memorial Museum
- Nima Sand Museum
- Oki Kyōdokan
- Okuizumo Tane Museum of Natural History
- Okuizumo Tatara Sword Museum
- Sanbe-Azukihara Buried Forest Park
- Sesshū Memorial Museum
- Shimane Prefectural Sanbe Nature Museum Sahimeru
- Shimane Prefectural Yakumotatsu Fudoki-no-Oka Museum
- Tsuwano Japan Heritage Centre
- Yunotsu Yakimono no Sato

==== Okayama ====
- Bizen Traditional Industry Hall, located in Imbe Station
- Okayama Prefecture Bizen Ceramics Museum
- Hayashibara Museum of Art
- Kawasaki Medical School
- Nagi Museum Of Contemporary Art
- Ohara Museum of Art
- Okayama Castle
- Okayama Orient Museum
- Okayama Prefectural Museum
- Okayama Prefectural Museum of Art
- Tsuyama Railroad Educational Museum
- Yumeji Art Museum

==== Hiroshima Prefecture ====
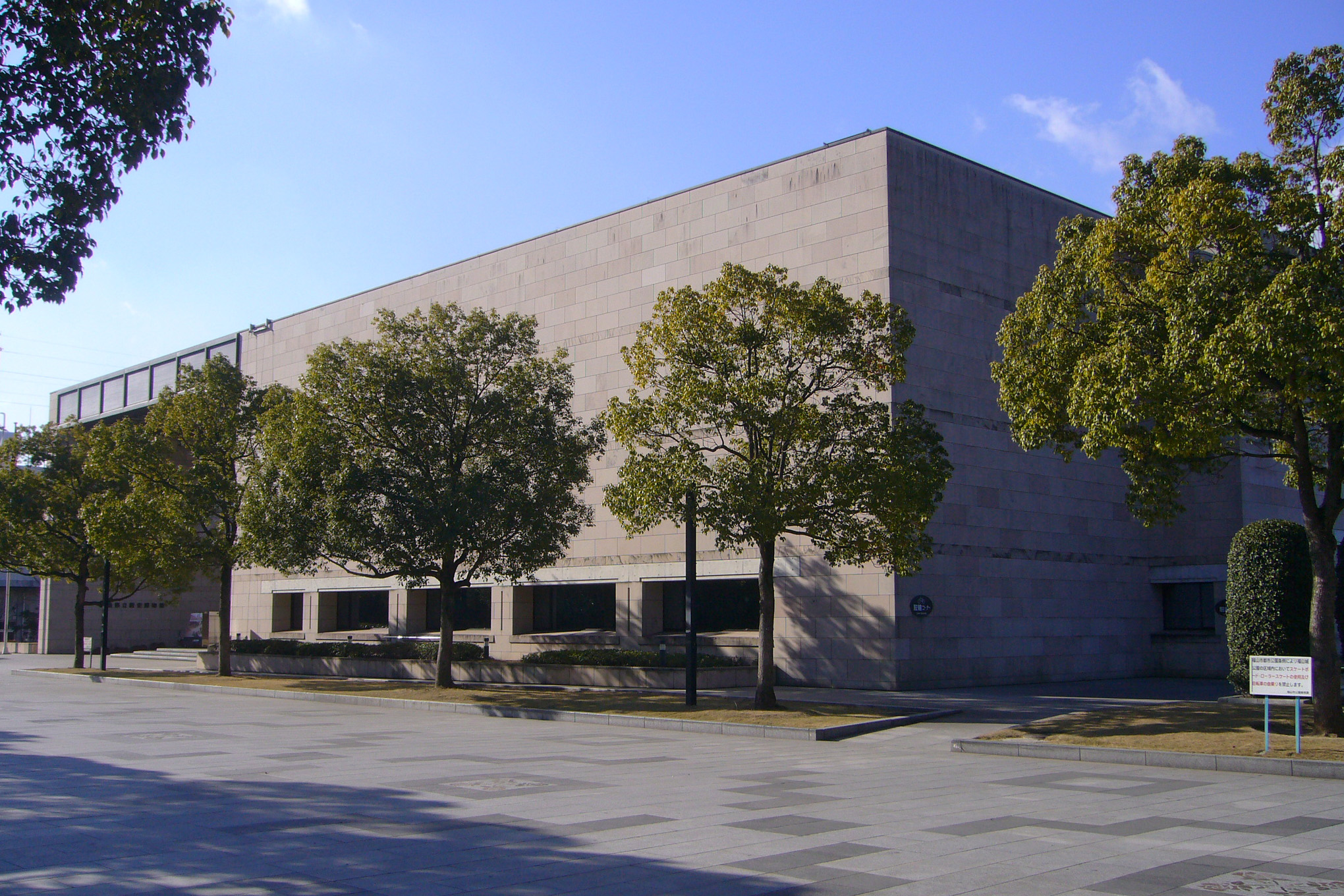
Hiroshima Prefectural Museum of History

===== Registered museums =====
As of 31 January 2019, and in line with the Museum Act, there were twenty-eight registered museums in Hiroshima Prefecture:

- Akitakata City History and Folk Museum
- Fukuyama Auto & Clock Museum
- Fukuyama Castle Museum
- Fukuyama City Shinichi Museum of History and Folklore
- Fukuyama Museum of Art
- Hirayama Ikuo Museum of Art
- Hiroshima Castle
- Hiroshima Children's Museum
- Hiroshima City Ebayama Museum of Meteorology
- Hiroshima City Museum of Contemporary Art
- Hiroshima City Museum of History and Traditional Crafts
- Hiroshima City Transportation Museum
- Hiroshima Museum of Art
- Hiroshima Prefectural Art Museum
- Hiroshima Prefectural History and Folklore Museum
- Hiroshima Prefectural Museum of History
- Hiwa Natural Science Museum
- Itsukushima Jinja Hōmotsukan
- Izumi Museum of Art
- Kōsan-ji Museum
- Kure Municipal Museum of Art
- Onomichi City Museum of Art
- Rai San'yō Historic Site Museum
- Shibuya Art Museum
- Taishaku Gorge Museum Jiyūkan
- Takehara Museum of Art
- Umi-Mori Art Museum
- Wood One Museum of Art

===== Designated museum-equivalent facilities =====
As of 31 January 2019, and in line with the Museum Act, there were five designated museum-equivalent facilities in Hiroshima Prefecture:

- Fude-no-Sato Kōbō
- Fukuyama City Zoo
- Hiroshima City Asa Zoological Park
- Hiroshima University Museum
- Miyajima Public Aquarium

===== Museum-like facilities, etc =====
- Atatajima Lighthouse Museum
- Fukuromachi Elementary School Peace Museum
- Fukuyama City Human Rights Peace Museum
- Fukuyama City Kannabe Historical Folklore Museum
- Fukuyama City Tomonoura Museum of History and Folklore
- Fukuyama Museum of Literature
- Health Sciences Museum
- Higashihiroshima City Museum of Art
- Hiroshima Botanical Garden
- Hiroshima Peace Memorial Museum
- Hiroshima Teishin Hospital Former Outpatients Ward Exhibition Room
- Holocaust Education Center
- Hon'inbō Shūsaku Igo Memorial Museum
- Honkawa Elementary School Peace Museum
- Innoshima Flower Center
- Innoshima Suigun Castle
- Irifuneyama Memorial Museum
- Iroha-maru Tenjikan
- Japan Coast Guard Museum
- JMSDF Kure Museum
- Kuchiwa Historical Museum
- Matsunaga Footwear Museum
- Mazda Museum
- Nakagawa Art Museum
- Nakata Museum
- Okuda Gensō Sayume Art Museum
- Ōkunoshima Poison Gas Museum
- Onomichi Film Museum
- Onomichi Historical Museum
- Onomichi Mansion of Literature
- Yachiyo no Oka Museum of Art
- Yamato Museum

===== Former museums =====
- Glass Village (Garasu no Sato) Museum
- Japan Folk Toy and Doll Museum
- Japan Footwear Museum

==== Yamaguchi Prefecture ====
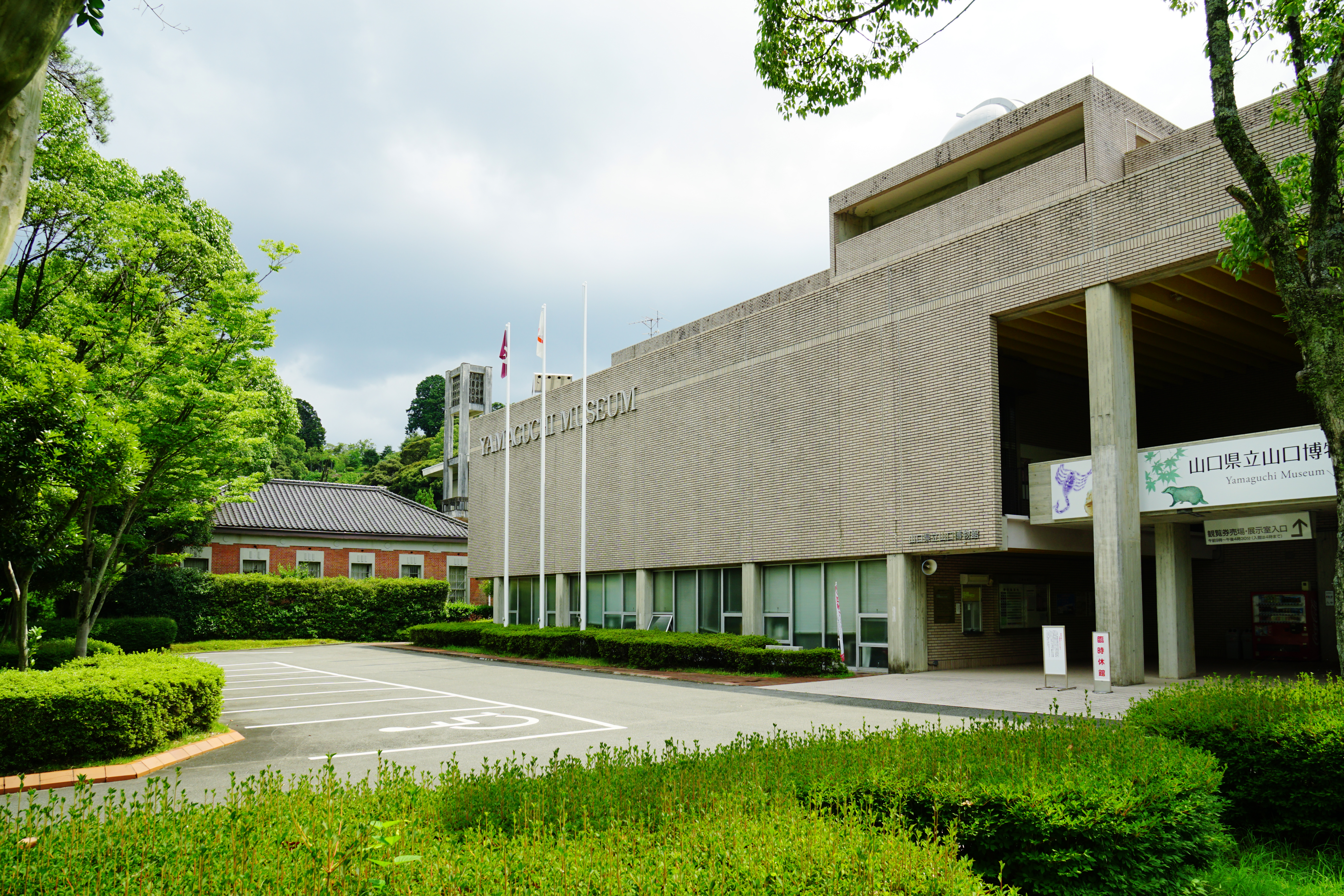
Yamaguchi Prefectural Museum

===== Registered museums and designated museum-equivalent facilities =====
- The Hagi Museum
- Hagi Uragami Museum
- Iwakuni Art Museum
- Iwakuni Chōkokan
- Kikkawa Historical Museum
- Kumaya Art Museum
- Mōri Museum
- Nomura Art Museum
- Shimonoseki City Archaeological Museum
- Shimonoseki City Art Museum
- Shimonoseki City Museum of History
- Shūnan City Museum of Art and History
- Yamaguchi Prefectural Museum
- Yamaguchi Prefectural Museum of Art
- Yoshika Taiba Memorial Museum

===== Museum-like facilities, etc =====
- Hoshino Tetsurō Museum
- Kaiten Memorial Museum
- Murata Seifū Memorial Museum
- Museum of Japanese Emigration to Hawaii
- Mutsu Memorial Museum
- Nakahara Chūya Memorial Museum
- Ube Tokiwa Museum
- Yamaguchi Prefectural Government Museum

=== Shikoku ===
==== Tokushima Prefecture ====
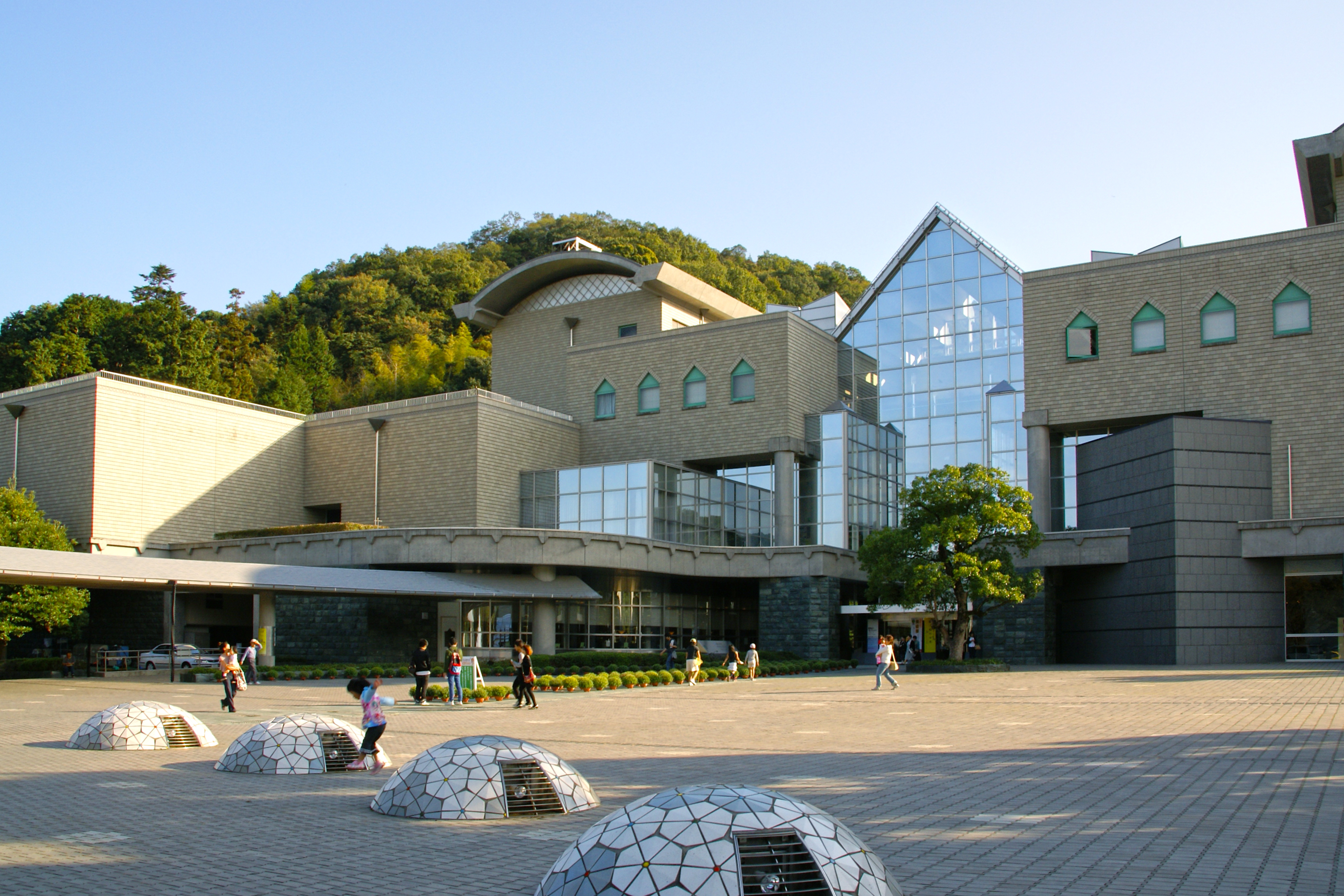
Tokushima Prefectural Museum

===== Registered museums and designated museum-equivalent facilities =====
- Hall of Awa Japanese Handmade Paper
- Matsushige Town Museum of History and Folklore - Ningyō Jōruri Theater Museum
- Ōtsuka Museum of Art
- Tokushima Archaeological Museum
- Tokushima Castle Museum
- Tokushima Modern Art Museum
- Tokushima Prefectural Museum
- Tokushima Prefectural Torii Ryūzō Memorial Museum

===== Museum-like facilities, etc =====
- Ai no Yakata
- Aioi Shinrin Museum of Art
- Ataka Museum of Art
- Anan Awa Kubō Folk Museum
- Awa City Donari Historical Museum
- Awa Ikeda Tobacco Museum - Awa Ikeda Udatsu House
- Awa Odori Kaikan
- Heike Yashiki Museum of Folklore
- Hiwasa Chelonian Museum Caretta
- Kagawa Toyohiko Memorial Museum
- Kaiyō Town Museum
- Kawata Folk Museum
- Mima Kyōdo Museum
- Misato Hotaru Museum
- Moraes Museum
- Naruto Galle No Mori Art Museum
- Naruto German House
- Ōnaruto Bridge Memorial Museum
- Sūō Art Museum
- Tokushima Botanical Garden
- Tokushima City Tenguhisa Museum
- Tokushima Prefectural Awa Jūrōbe Yashiki
- Tokushima Prefectural Buried Cultural Properties Research Centre
- Tokushima Prefectural Museum of Literature and Calligraphy
- Tokushima Science Museum
- Tokushima War Dead Memorial Museum

==== Kagawa Prefecture ====
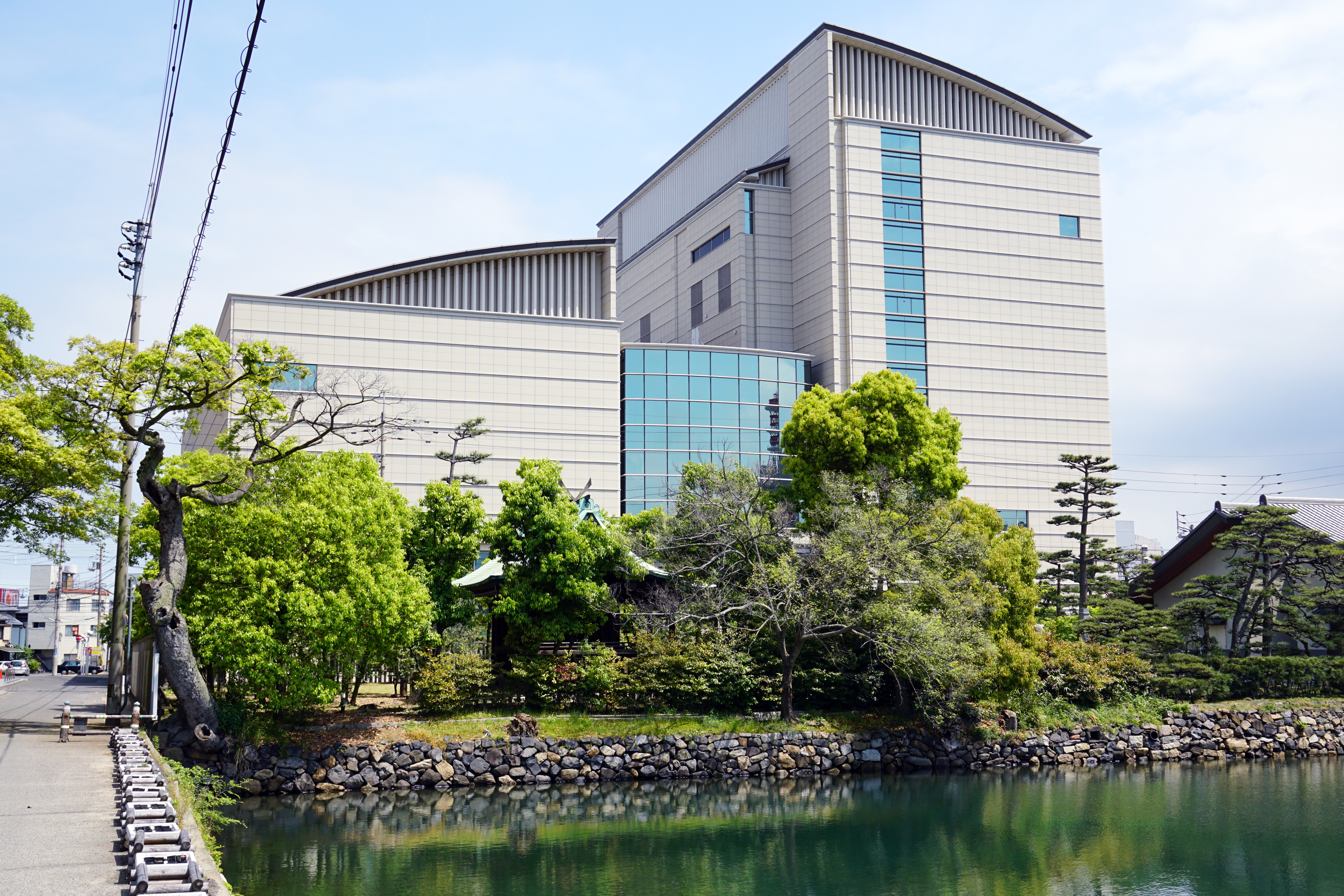
The Kagawa Museum

===== Registered museums and designated museum-equivalent facilities =====
- Chichū Art Museum
- Isamu Noguchi Garden Museum
- The Kagawa Museum
- Kamada Museum
- Kotohira-gū Museum
- Shikoku Mura
- Takamatsu Art Museum
- Takamatsu City Stone Folk Museum
- Takamatsu Historical Museum

===== Museum-like facilities, etc =====
In addition to the above, the following are member museums of the Kagawa Museum Association (香川県資料館協議会):

- Araki Kazuo Memorial Folk Tool Museum (Sanuki Senshintei)* Ayagawa Lifelong Learning Center
- Henro Exchange Salon
- Higashikagawa City History and Folk Museum
- Hiraga Gennai Memorial Museum
- Ibukijima Folk History Museum
- Kagawa Glove Museum
- Kagawa Memorial Water Park Water Museum
- Kagawa Prefectural Goshikidai Children's Nature Center
- Kan'onji City Museum
- Kinryō-no-Sato Sake Museum
- Kotohira Town History and Folklore Museum
- Local Doll Museum
- Marugame Museum
- Marukin Soy Sauce Museum
- Mitoyo City Takuma Town Folk Museum
- Mount Shiude Archaeological Museum
- Sakaide City Museum
- Sakaide City Salt Industry Museum
- Sanuki City History and Folk Museum
- Sanuki Kokubun-ji Site Museum
- Sea Science Museum
- Seto Inland Sea Folk History Museum
- Seto Ōhashi Memorial Museum
- Sōkichi Kawara no Sato Exhibition Hall
- Tadotsu Town Museum
- Takamatsu City Kōnan History and Folk Museum
- Takamatsu Suidō Museum
- Toramaru Puppet Theater Museum
- Toyohama Folk Museum (Cotton Museum)
- Ushiyaguchi Shūkokan
- Utazu industrial Museum
- World Coin Museum
- Yoshima Museum
- Zentsūji City Local Folk Museum

Other related facilities include:

- Benesse Art Site Naoshima
- Benesse House
- George Nakashima Memorial Gallery
- Kagawa Prefectural Higashiyama Kaii Setouchi Art Museum
- Lee Ufan Museum
- Marugame Art Museum
- Marugame Castle
- Marugame Hirai Art Museum
- Marugame Inokuma Genichirō Museum of Contemporary Art
- Marugame Uchiwa no Minato Museum
- Museum of JGSDF Camp Zentsuji
- Ozaki Hōsai Memorial Museum
- Teshima Art Museum
- Teshima Yokoo House
- Tsuboi Sakae Museum of Literature
- Shodoshima Yokai Art Museum

==== Ehime Prefecture ====
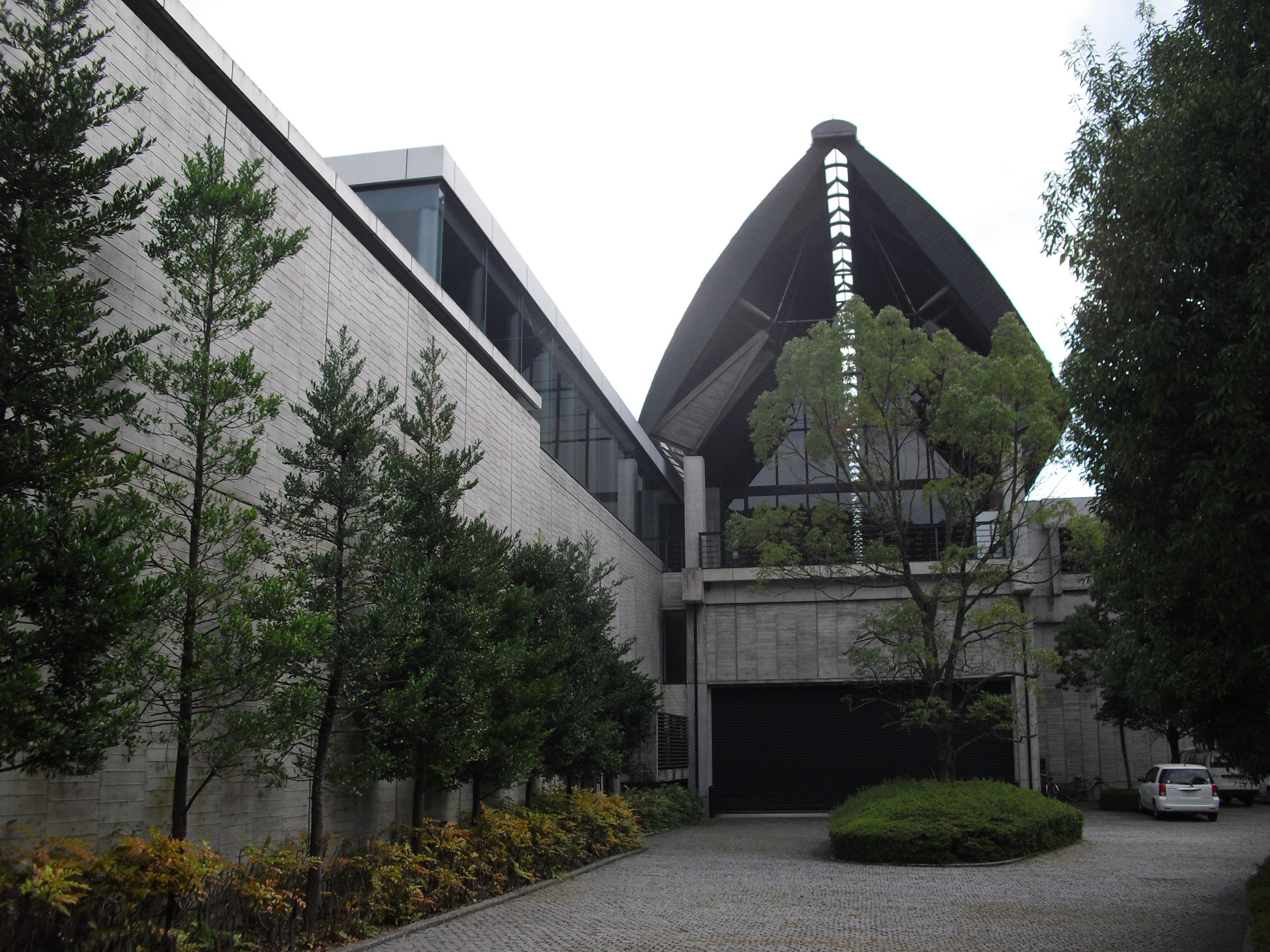
Museum of Ehime History and Culture

===== Registered museums =====
As of 1 April 2020, and in line with the Museum Act, there were eighteen registered museums in Ehime Prefecture:

- Ehime Bunkakan
- Ehime Mingeikan
- Ehime Prefectural Science Museum
- Ikata Town Museum
- Itami Jūzō Memorial Museum
- Murakami Kaizoku Museum (also referred to as the Murakami Suigun Museum)
- The Museum of Art, Ehime
- Museum of Ehime History and Culture
- Niihama City Museum of Art
- Ōmishima Maritime Museum
- Ōmishima Museum of Art Honkan
- Ōmishima Museum of Art Annex: Iwata Ken Mother and Child Museum, Imabari City
- Ōmishima Museum of Art Annex: Tokoro Museum Ōmishima
- Ōyamazumi Jinja Hōmotsukan
- Ōzu City Museum
- Shiki Memorial Museum
- Tōon City Museum of History and Folklore
- Uwajima City Date Museum

===== Designated museum-equivalent facilities =====
As of 1 April 2020, and in line with the Museum Act, there were six designated museum-equivalent facilities in Ehime Prefecture:

- Kuma Museum of Art
- Hirose Memorial Museum
- Saijō City Saijō Folk Museum
- Saka no Ue no Kumo Museum
- Takabatake Kashō Taishō Roman-kan
- Tobe Zoological Park of Ehime Prefecture

===== Museum-like facilities, etc =====
- Akagane Museum
- Besshi Copper Mine Memorial Museum
- Ehime Prefectural Lifelong Learning Center
- Ehime University Museum
- Higurashi Villa Memorial Museum
- Ikazaki Kite Museum
- Imabari City Kōno Museum of Art
- Itō Toyoo Museum of Architecture, Imabari
- Kaimei School
- Kawara-kan
- Kubota Palm Garden
- Matsuyama Archaeological Museum
- Murakami Santō Memorial Museum
- Omogo Mountain Museum
- Paper Museum
- Railway History Park, Saijō
- Shikokuchūō City Museum of History and Archaeology
- Tamagawa Museum of Modern Art, Imabari
- Tobe Ware Traditional Industry Hall
- Towel Museum Ichihiro
- Uwajima City Historical Museum

==== Kōchi Prefecture ====
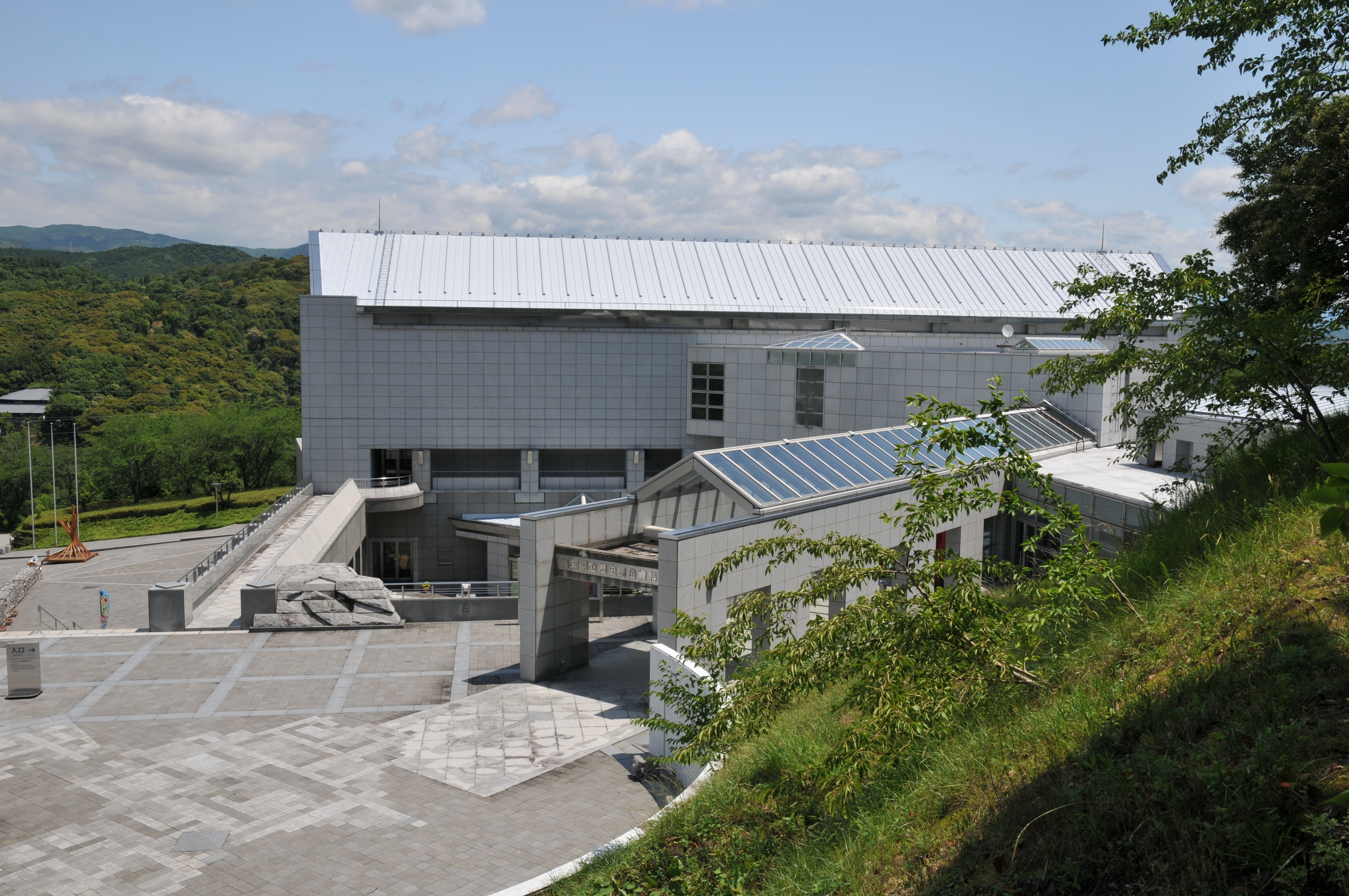
Kōchi Prefectural Museum of History

===== Registered museums and designated museum-equivalent facilities =====
- Aki City Calligraphy Museum
- Aki City Museum of History and Folklore
- Kami City Art Museum
- Kami City Takashi Yanase Memorial Hall & Anpanman Museum
- Kochi Liberty and People's Rights Museum
- Kōchi Prefectural Museum of History
- Katsurahama aquarium
- Muroto Schoolhouse Aquarium
- The Museum of Art, Kōchi
- Ryūga Cave Museum
- Sakawa Town Aoyama Bunko
- Sukumo City History Museum
- Yokoyama Memorial Manga Museum

===== Museum-like facilities, etc =====
- Ekin Museum
- Former Yamauchi Residence
- Ino Paper Museum
- Kōchi Castle
- Kōchi Castle Museum of History
- Kōchi Literary Museum
- Makino Botanical Garden
- Ryōma's Birthplace Memorial Museum
- Sakamoto Ryōma Memorial Museum
- Tosa Yamauchi Family Treasury and Archives
- Yanase Takashi Memorial Hall
- Yokokurayama Natural Forest Museum
- Yoshii Isamu Memorial Museum
- Zuizan Memorial Museum

=== Kyushu ===
==== Fukuoka ====
- Fukuoka Art Museum
- Fukuoka City Museum
- Fukuoka Oriental Ceramics Museum
- Fukuoka Prefectural Museum of Art
- Gorōyama kofun
- Idemitsu Museum of Arts
- Itokoku History Museum
- Kitakyushu Municipal Museum of Art
- Kitakyushu Museum of Natural History & Human History
- Kokura Castle
- Kubote Historical Museum
- Kurume City Art Museum
- Kyushu Historical Museum
- Kyushu National Museum
- Matsumoto Seichō Memorial Museum
- Tachiarai Peace Memorial Museum

==== Saga Prefecture ====
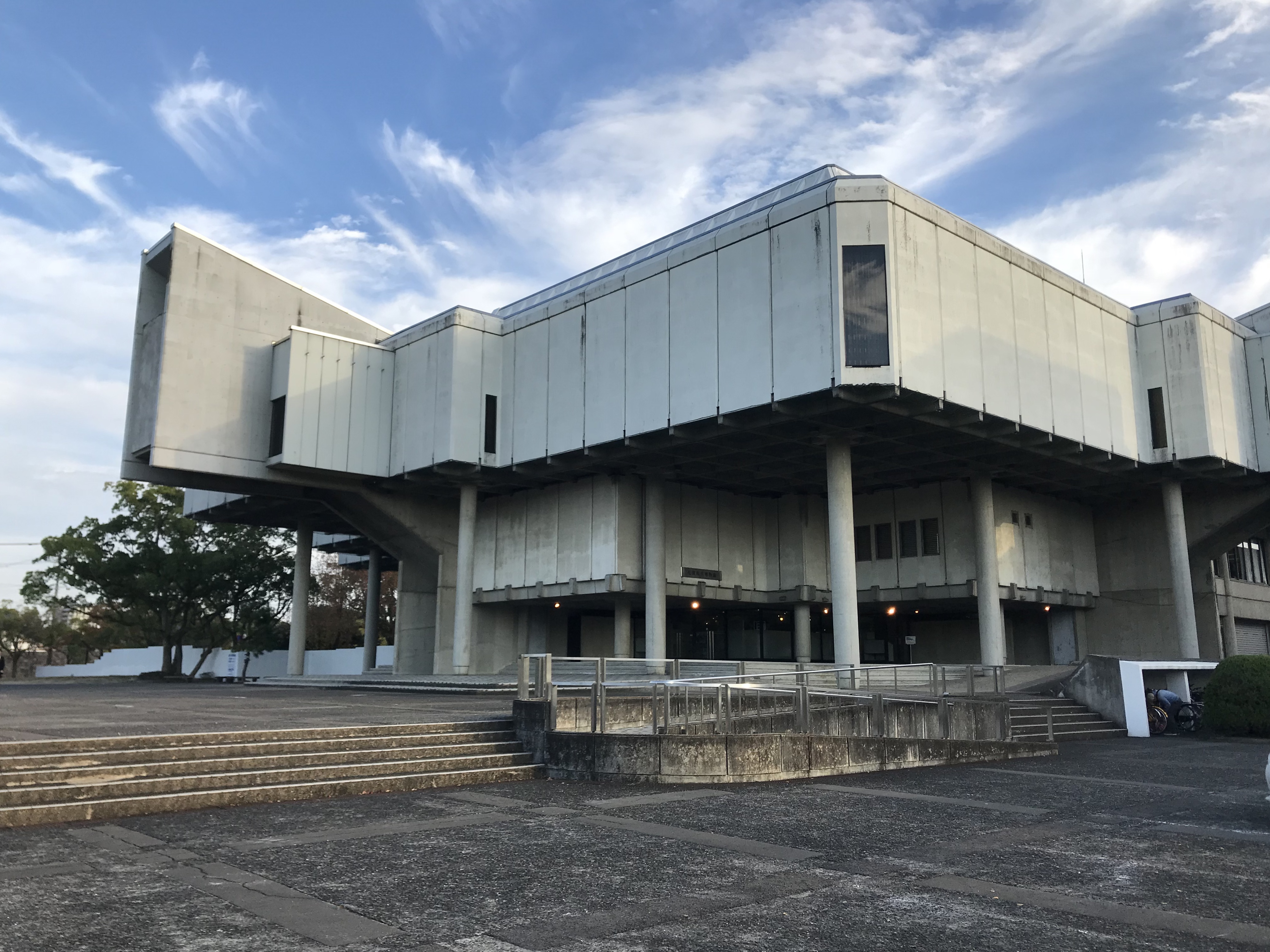
Saga Prefectural Museum

===== Registered museums and designated museum-equivalent facilities =====
- Arita Ceramic Art Museum
- Arita Porcelain Park
- Chōkokan
- Imaemon Museum of Ceramic Antiques
- Kawamura Art Museum
- Kyūshū Ceramic Museum
- Nakatomi Memorial Medicine Museum
- Saga Castle History Museum
- Saga Prefectural Art Museum
- Saga Prefectural Museum
- Saga Prefectural Nagoya Castle Museum
- Yōkō Art Museum
- Yūtoku Museum

===== Museum-like facilities, etc =====
- Arita Folk and History Museum East Building & Arita Ware Reference Museum
- Fukagawa Porcelain China On The Park Chūjikan
- Genkai Town Museum of History and Folklore
- Imari City Ceramic Merchants Museum
- Imari History and Folklore Museum
- Imari-Nabeshima Gallery
- Kamimine Town Furusato Gakkan
- Karatsu Castle
- Karatsu City Kodai no Mori Kaikan
- Kashima City Folk Museum
- Kōhoku Town Museum
- Matsurokan
- Muraoka Sōhonpo Yōkan Museum
- Nakabayashi Gochiku Memorial Museum
- Ogi City Historical Museum
- Ōkuma Shigenobu Memorial Museum
- Saga City History and Folklore Museum
- Saga Prefecture Agricultural Research Center Museum
- Saga Prefecture Space and Science Museum
- Saga University Art Museum
- Sano Tsunetami Memorial Museum
- Shida Ware Museum
- Taihei-an Sake Brewery Museum
- Takeo City Library and History Museum
- Taku City Museum
- Tara Town Museum of History and Folklore
- Ureshino City Museum of History and Folklore
- Yoshinogari site Yayoi Life Museum

==== Nagasaki Prefecture ====
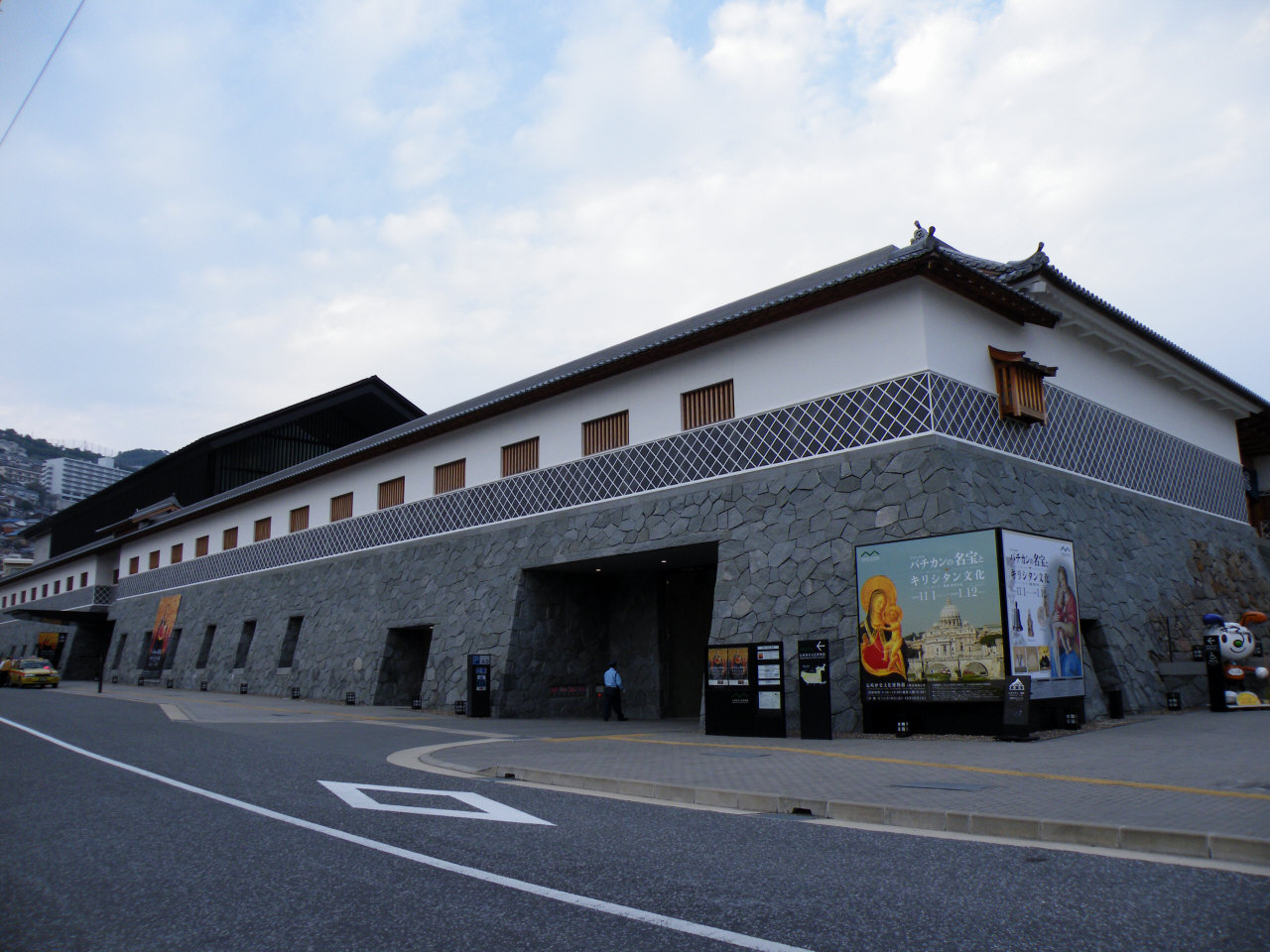
Nagasaki Museum of History and Culture

===== Registered museums and designated museum-equivalent facilities =====
- Confucius Shrine & Historical Museum of China
- Huis Ten Bosch Museums
- Iki City Ikikoku Museum
- Ikitsuki Island Museum, Shima no Yakata
- Matsura Historical Museum
- Nagasaki Junshin Catholic University Museum
- Nagasaki Museum of History and Culture
- Nagasaki Prefectural Art Museum
- Sasebo City Museum, Shimase Art Center
- Shin-Kamigotō Geihinkan Museum
- Unzen Vidro Museum

===== Museum-like facilities, etc =====
- Endō Shūsaku Literary Museum
- Glover Garden
- Gunkanjima Museum
- Former Hong Kong and Shanghai Banking Nagasaki Branch Memorial Multi-Purpose Hall
- Gotō Kankō History Museum
- Hirado Castle
- Hirado Dutch Trading Post
- Hirado Kirishitan Museum
- Inori-no-Oka Picture Book Museum
- Kamitsushima Town Museum of History and Folklore
- Matsunaga Yasuzaemon Memorial Museum
- Matsuura City Buried Cultural Property Center
- MDSF Sasebo History Museum
- Mine Town Museum of History and Folklore
- Mitsubishi Heavy Industries Nagasaki Shipyard & Machinery Works Historical Museum
- Mount Unzen Disaster Memorial Hall
- Nagasaki Atomic Bomb Museum
- Nagasaki City Bekkō Crafts Museum
- Nagasaki City Father de Rotz Memorial Museum
- Nagasaki City Iōjima Lighthouse Memorial Museum
- Nagasaki City Kameyama Shachū Memorial Museum
- Nagasaki City Maizō Shiryōkan
- Nagasaki City Museum of History and Folklore
- Nagasaki City Noguchi Yatarō Memorial Museum of Art
- Nagasaki City Old Photograph Museum
- Nagasaki City Science Museum
- Nagasaki City Sotome Museum of History and Folklore
- Nagasaki City Takashima Coal Museum
- Nagasaki National Peace Memorial Hall for the Atomic Bomb Victims
- Nagasaki Peace Museum
- Nagasaki Prefectural Tsushima Museum of History and Folklore
- Santo Domingo Church Museum
- Satotabaru Museum of History and Folklore
- Shimabara Castle
- Shimizu Kon Exhibition Hall (Nakano Chaya)
- Siebold Memorial Museum
- Suka Gogodō Art Museum
- Toyotama Museum
- Tsushima Museum
- Twenty-Six Martyrs Museum and Monument

===== Former facilities =====
- Nagasaki Subtropical Botanical Garden

==== Kumamoto Prefecture ====
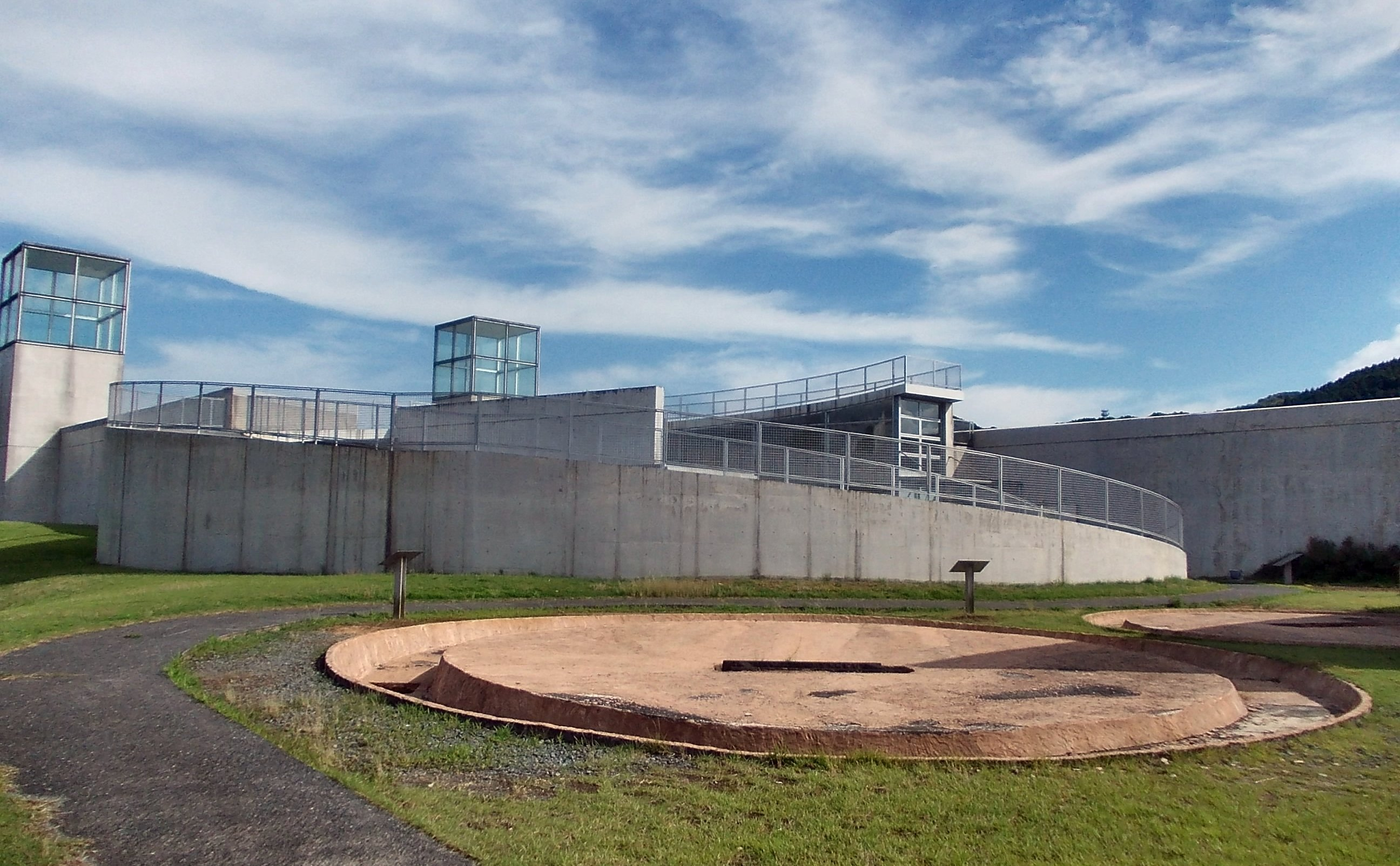
Kumamoto Prefectural Ancient Burial Mound Museum

===== Registered museums and designated museum-equivalent facilities =====
- Honmyō-ji Hōmotsukan
- Hoshino Tomihiro Museum of Art, Ashikita
- Kikuchi Shrine Historical Museum
- Kumamoto City Museum
- Kumamoto International Folk Craft Museum
- Kumamoto Prefectural Ancient Burial Mound Museum
- Kumamoto Prefectural Museum of Art
- Kumamoto University Memorial Museum of the Fifth High School
- Matsui Bunko Museum Kisai
- Shimada Museum of Arts
- Shinpūren Museum
- Tamana City Historical Museum Kokoropia
- Yamaga City Museum
- Yatsushiro City Museum Future Forest Museum
- Yunomae Manga Museum

===== Museum-like facilities, etc =====
- Amakusa Archives
- Amakusa Christian Museum
- Amakusa City Itsuwa Museum of History and Folklore
- Amakusa Collegio Museum
- Amakusa Rosary Museum
- Arao City Miyazaki Brothers Museum
- Arao Cultural Center & Children's Science Museum
- Aso Volcano Museum
- Contemporary Art Museum, Kumamoto
- Goshoura Cretaceous Museum
- Gotō Zezan Memorial Museum
- Higo no Satoyama Gallery
- Hondo Museum of History and Folklore
- Inukai Memorial Museum of Art
- Itsuki Village History and Culture Exchange Center, Historia Terrace Itsukidani
- The Janes' Residence, Kumamoto
- Kitasato Shibasaburō Memorial Museum
- Kiyoura Memorial Museum
- Koizumi Yakumo Former Residence in Kumamoto
- Kōshi City Kōshi Historical Museum
- Kōshi City Nishi-Gōshi Historical Museum
- Kumamoto City Tabaruzaka Seinan Civil War Museum
- Kumamoto City Tsukahara Historical Museum,
- Kumamoto City Water Science Museum
- Kumamoto City Zoological and Botanic Gardens
- Kumamoto Museum of History and Literature
- Kumamoto Prefectural Traditional Arts Center
- Kyūsendō Forest Museum
- Matsumae Shigeyoshi Memorial Museum
- Mifune Dinosaur Museum
- Minamata Disease Museum
- Minamiaso Luna Observatory
- Nagomi Town Museum of History and Folklore
- Natsume Sōseki Former Residence in Uchitsuboimachi
- Newspaper Museum
- Ōzu Town Museum of History and Cultural Tradition
- Reihoku History Museum
- Riddell-Wright Memorial Hall
- Sakamoto Zenzō Museum of Art
- Seiwa Bunraku Museum
- Shiken Fujin Memorial Museum
- Sohō Memorial Museum
- Tsunagi Art Museum
- Tokutomi Memorial Garden
- Uki City Shiranuhi Museum (cf. shiranui)
- Yamae Village History and Folklore Museum
- Yamaga Lantern Folk Craft Museum
- Yokoi Shōnan Memorial Museum

==== Ōita Prefecture ====
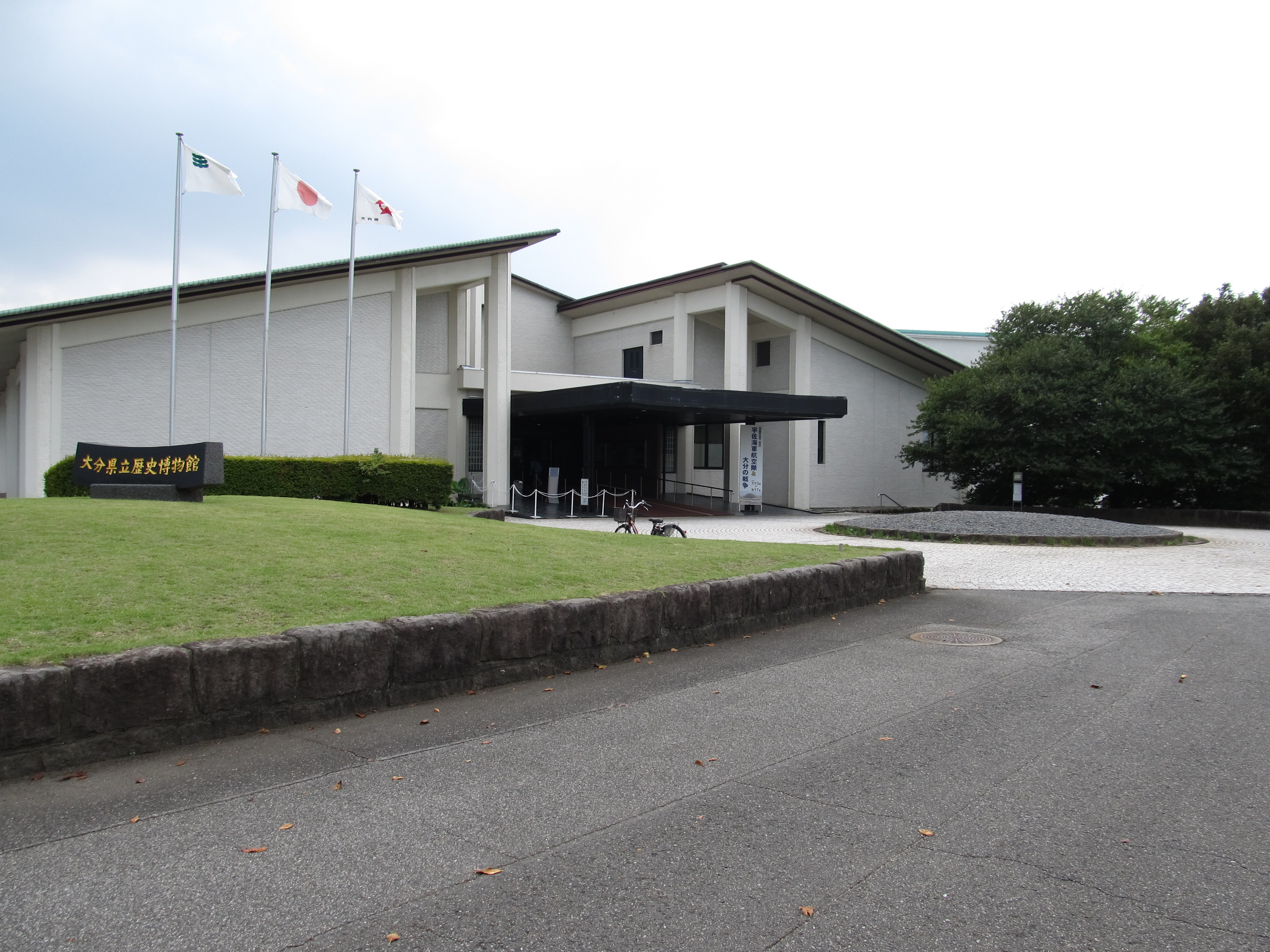
Ōita Prefectural Museum of History

===== Registered museums =====
As of 1 April 2020, and in line with the Museum Act, there were five registered museums in Ōita Prefecture:

- Kunisaki City Historical Learning Centre
- Nakatsu History Museum
- Nikaidō Museum of Art
- Ōita City Art Museum
- Ōita Prefectural Museum of History

===== Designated museum-equivalent facilities =====
As of 1 April 2020, and in line with the Museum Act, there were ten designated museum-equivalent facilities in Ōita Prefecture:

- Beppu University Museum
- Hirose Museum
- Hita City Museum
- Kurushima Takehiko Memorial Hall
- Kyūshū Natural Animal Park African Safari
- Ōita Fragrance Museum
- Ōita Marine Palace Aquarium "Umitamago"
- Ōita Prefectural Art Museum
- Ōita Prefecture Ancient Sages Historical Archives
- Yabakei Museum

===== Museum-like facilities, etc. =====
In addition to the above, the following facilities are member museums of the Ōita Prefectural Museum Council (大分県博物館協議会):

- Asakura Fumio Memorial Museum
- Beppu City Art Museum
- Bungo-Ōno City Museum of History and Folklore
- Hiroike Chikurō Memorial Museum
- Kitsuki Castle Town Museum
- Miura Baien Museum, Kunisaki
- Nakatsu Castle
- Nakatsu City Museum of History and Folklore
- Ōita City Historical Museum
- Ōita Takasaki-yama Natural Wildlife Park
- Taketa City Historical Museum
- Usa Jingū Hōmotsukan

Other facilities include:

- Ama Kofun Shiryōkan
- Beppu Art Museum
- Comico Art Museum Yufuin
- Nogami Yaeko Memorial Museum of Literature
- Nada-gū Hōmotsukan
- Ōita Kenritsu Geijutsu Kaikan
- Saiki History Museum
- Sano Botanical Garden
- Tenryō Hita Museum
- Yufuin Modern Art Museum
- Yufuin Retro Motor Museum

==== Miyazaki Prefecture ====
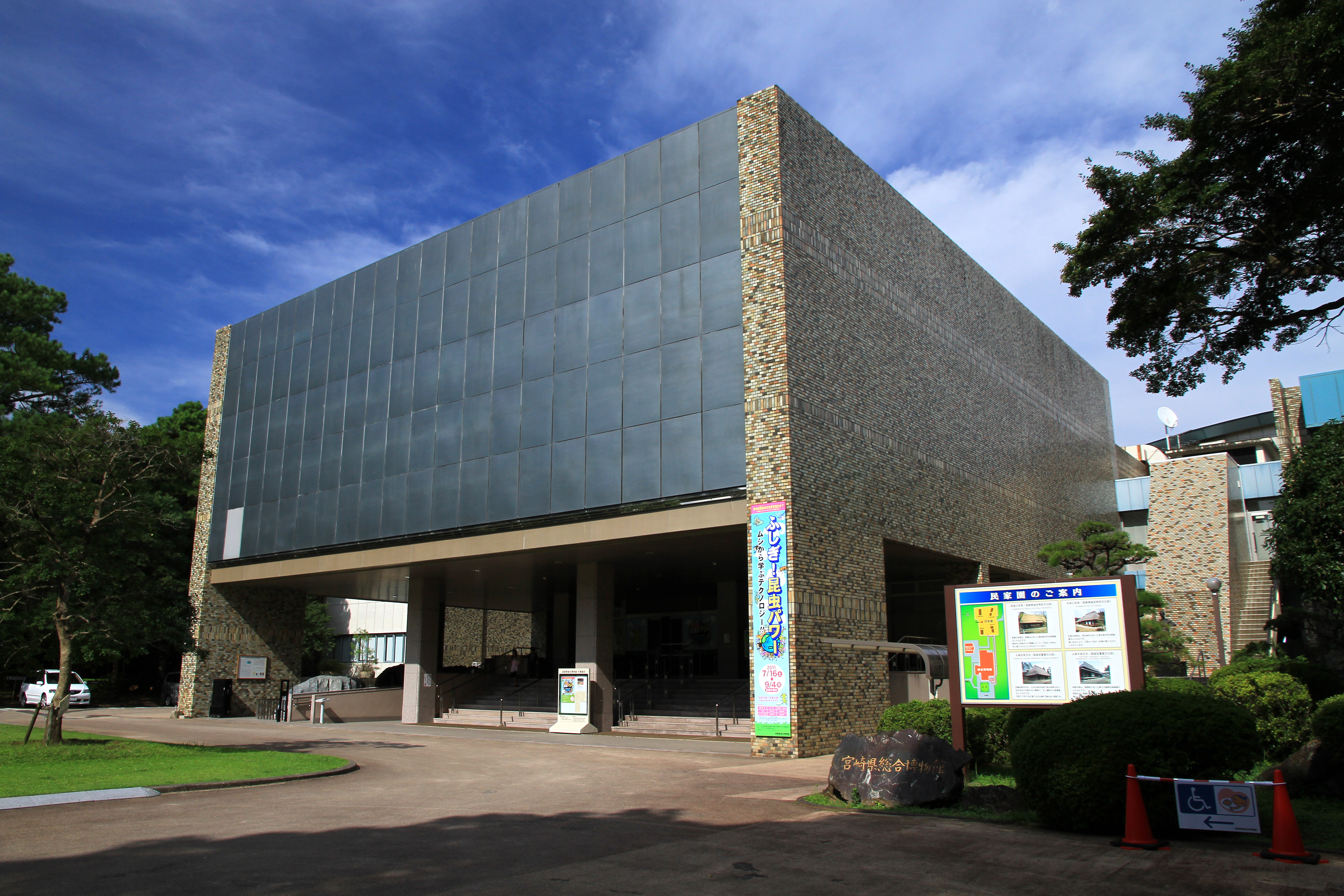
Miyazaki Prefectural Museum of Nature and History

===== Registered museums and designated museum-equivalent facilities =====
- Miyakonojō City Museum of Art
- Miyazaki Prefectural Art Museum
- Miyazaki Prefectural Museum of Nature and History
- Saitobaru Archaeological Museum of Miyazaki Prefecture
- Shiiba Folk Arts Museum
- Takanabe Museum of Art

===== Museum-like facilities, etc =====
- Agricultural Museum, University of Miyazaki Faculty of Agriculture
- Aoshima Subtropical Botanical Garden
- Aya International Craft Castle
- Ebino History and Folklore Museum
- Former Yoshimatsu Family Residence
- Gokase Town Museum of the Blessings of Nature
- Hyūga City History and Folk Museum
- Hyūga City Hososhima Port Museum
- Ishii Jūji Shiryōkan
- Kadogawa History and Folk Museum
- Kunitomi Sōgō Bunka Kaikan
- Miyakonojō History Museum
- Miyakonojō Shimazu Residence
- Miyazaki Art Center
- Miyazaki City Museum of History & Ikime-no-Mori Yūkokan
- Miyazaki Jingū Chōkokan
- Miyazaki Prefectural Buried Cultural Property Center
- Miyazaki Science Center
- Morotsuka Folk Museum
- Naitō Memorial Museum
- Nishimera Museum of History and Folklore
- Nobeoka Botanical Garden
- Nojiri Museum of History and Folklore
- Obi Castle History Museum
- Ōyodo River Study Center
- Saito City Museum of History and Folklore
- Takachiho Community Center
- Takanabe Town Museum of History
- Wakayama Bokusui Memorial Museum of Literature
- Yasui Sokken Memorial Museum

===== Former museums =====
- Miyazaki Museum of History and Culture

==== Kagoshima Prefecture ====
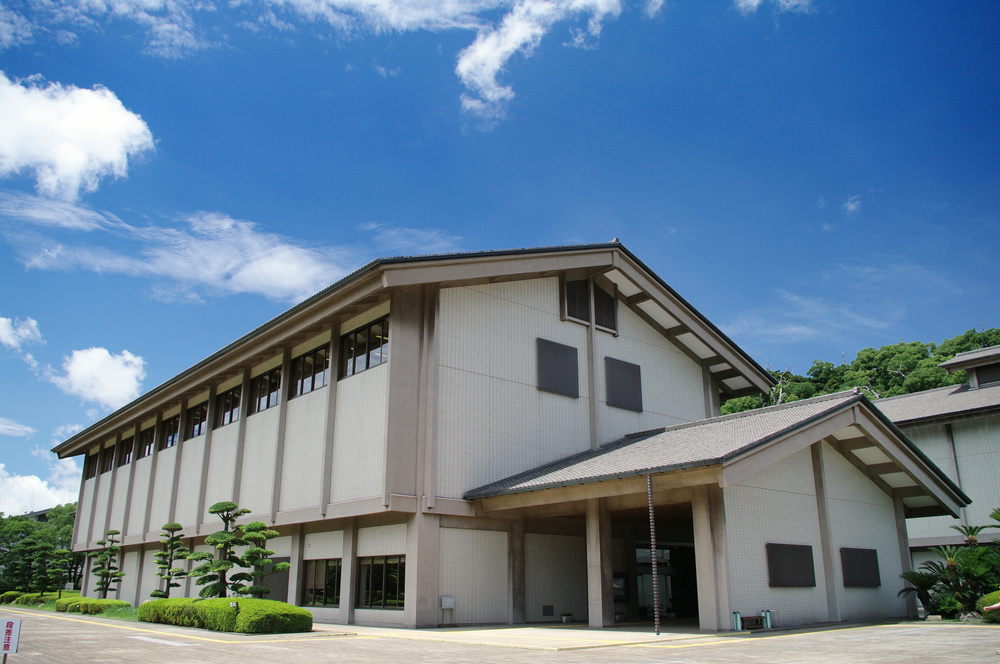
Reimeikan, Kagoshima Prefectural Center for Historical Material

===== Registered museums and designated museum-equivalent facilities =====
- Harano Agricultural Museum
- Ibusuki Archaeological Museum, Jiyūkan Cocco Hashimure
- The International University of Kagoshima Faculty of Intercultural Studies Museum of Archaeology
- Iwasaki Art Museum
- Jigen-ryū Swordsmanship Museum
- Kagoshima City Modern Literature Museum & Kagoshima City Märchen Fairy Tale Museum
- Kagoshima City Museum of Art
- Kagoshima Prefectural Museum
- Kagoshima University Museum
- Kodama Museum of Art
- Matsushita Museum of Art
- Miyake Museum of Art
- Nagashima Museum
- Nakamura Shinya Art Museum
- Reimeikan, Kagoshima Prefectural Center for Historical Material
- Shōko Shūseikan
- Yoshii Junji Art Museum
- Yōzan Museum of Art

===== Museum-like facilities, etc =====
As of 20 June 2019, other than the above, the following were members of the Kagoshima Prefecture Museum Association (鹿児島県博物館協会):

- Aira City History and Folk Museum
- Akune City History Museum
- Amami City Amami Museum (also a member museum of Okinawa Prefecture Museum Society)
- Amami City Museum of History and Folklore (member museum of Okinawa Prefecture Museum Society)
- Amami Park (Amami no Sato, Tanaka Isson Memorial Museum of Art)
- Chin Jukan Museum
- Flower Park Kagoshima
- Hioki City Fukiage Museum of History and Folklore
- Hirota Site Museum & Park
- History Museum Kimpō, Minamisatsuma City
- Isen Town Museum of History and Folklore
- Ishibashi Park & Memorial Hall
- Izumi City Crane Museum, Crane Park Izumi
- Izumi City History and Folk Museum
- Izumi Fumoto History Museum
- Japan Mandarin Orange Center
- Kagoshima Aquarium
- Kagoshima City Hirakawa Zoological Park
- Kagoshima City Museum of Archaeology
- Kagoshima Immaculate Heart University Museum
- Kagoshima Municipal Science Hall
- Kagoshima Women's Junior College Museum
- Kasasa Art Museum, Minamisatsuma (Kurose Lookout Museum)
- Kasasa Ebisu
- Kihoku Historical Folk Museum, Kanoya City
- Kimotsuki Museum of History and Folklore
- Kirishima City Hayato Museum of History and Folklore
- Kirishima Open Air Museum
- Kirishima Kokubu Museum of History
- Kishinkan, Bōnotsu Center for Historical Material
- Makurazaki Nanmeikan Cultural Resource Center
- Minamisatsuma Municipal Museum on Kaseda Local History
- Minamitane Town Museum
- Miyanojō Historical Center, Satsuma
- Muku Hatojū Memorial Museum of Literature
- Museum Chiran
- Museum of the Meiji Restoration
- Nagashima Town Museum of History and Folklore
- Nakatane Town Museum of History and Folklore
- Saigō Nanshū Memorial Museum
- Sakurajima Visitor Center
- Satsuma Denshōkan
- Satsuma Students Museum
- Satsumasendai History Museum
- Satsumasendai Magokoro Museum of Literature
- Setouchi Town Library & Setouchi Municipal Museum (also a member museum of Okinawa Prefecture Museum Society)
- Shibushi City Buried Cultural Property Center
- Sueyoshi Museum of History and Folklore, Soo City
- Tanegashima Akagome Museum
- Tanegashima Development Center
- Tokunoshima Town Museum
- Uenohara Jōmon no Mori
- Wadomari Town Museum of History and Folklore (also a member museum of Okinawa Prefecture Museum Society)
- Yakushima Environmental and Cultural Village Center
- Yakushima Town History and Folk Museum
- Yakusugi Museum

In addition to the above, the following facilities are in Kagoshima Prefecture:

- Bansei Tokkō Peace Museum
- Chiran Peace Museum for Kamikaze Pilots
- Ei Museum of History and Folklore, Minamikyūshū
- Kanoya Air Base Museum
- Kihoku Astronomical Museum
- Kirishima City Museum of History and Folklore
- Little Miyata Museum
- Nansatsu Railway Museum
- Nihonga Memorial Museum of Art, Sōbun
- Sakurajima International Volcanic Sabō Center
- Sendai Space Hall
- Yokogawa Museum of History and Traditional Crafts, Kirishima

=== Okinawa Prefecture ===
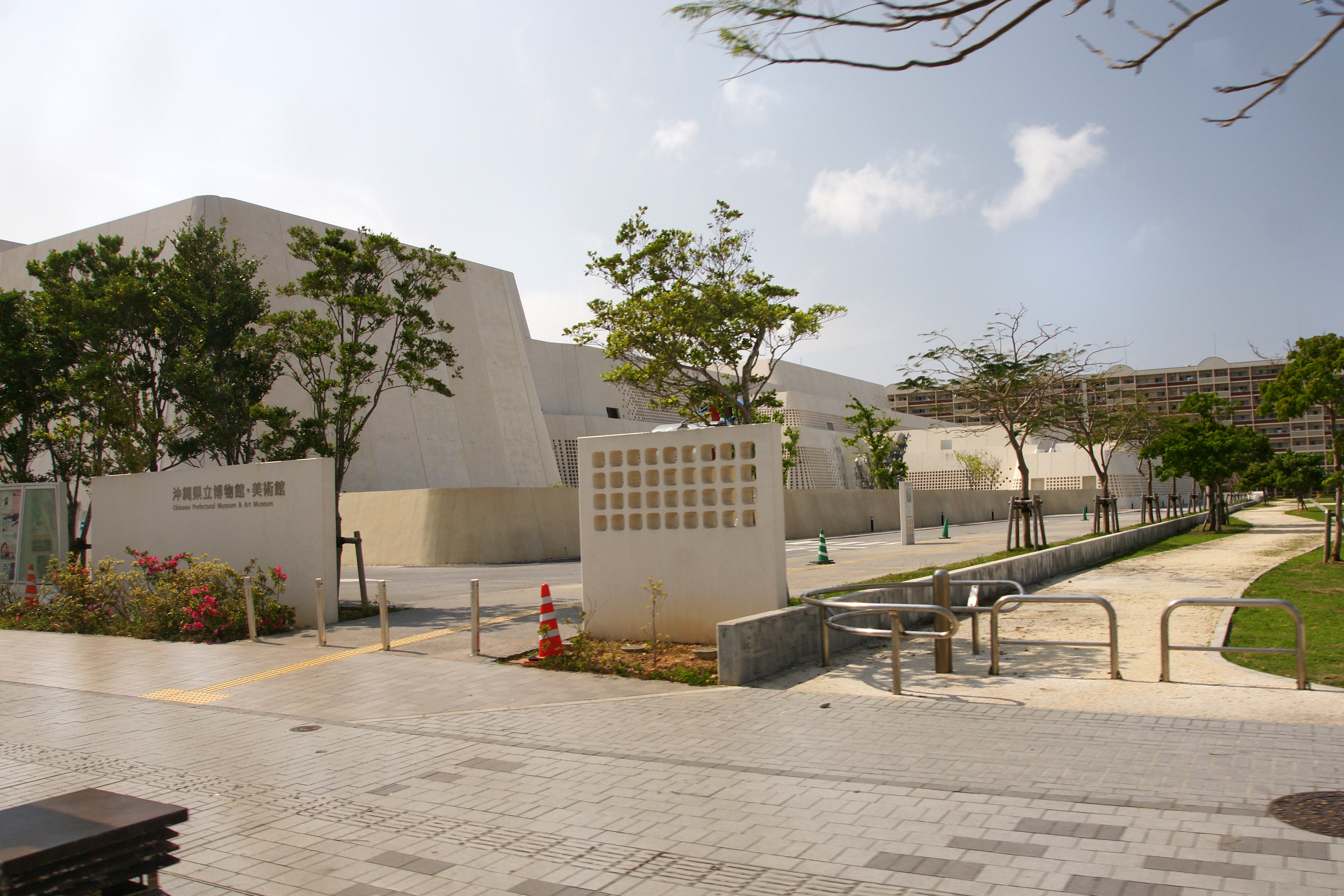
Okinawa Prefectural Museum & Art Museum

==== Registered museums ====
As of 1 May 2018, and in line with the Museum Act, there were eleven registered museums in Okinawa Prefecture:

- Ginowan City Museum
- Himeyuri Peace Museum
- Ishigaki City Yaeyama Museum
- Kumejima Museum
- Miyakojima City Museum
- Nago Museum
- Naha Municipal Tsuboya Pottery Museum
- Okinawa Churaumi Aquarium
- Okinawa Municipal Museum
- Okinawa Prefectural Museum & Art Museum
- Urasoe Art Museum

==== Designated museum-equivalent facilities ====
As of 1 May 2018, and in line with the Museum Act, there were six designated museum-equivalent facilities in Okinawa Prefecture:

- Haebaru Culture Center
- Okinawa Kodomo Future Zone
- Okinawa World
- Southeast Botanical Gardens
- Ryūkyū University Museum (Fūju-kan)
- Tsushima-maru Memorial Museum

==== Museum-like facilities, etc. ====
In addition to the above, and as of 1 May 2018, the Okinawa Prefectural Government lists the following facilities:

- Anti-War Peace Museum (Nuchi du Takara no Ie)
- Ayamihabiru Museum
- Butterfly Museum Kabira
- Former Navy Headquarters
- Ginoza Village Museum
- Higashi Village Mountain and Water Life Museum
- Iheya Village History and Folk Museum
- Iriomote Wildlife Conservation Center
- Ishigaki Island Limestone Cave
- Ishigaki Yaima Mura
- Izena Fureai Folk Museum
- Kihō-in Shūshūkan
- Kohama Folk Museum
- Kumejima Firefly Museum
- Kumejima Sea Turtle Museum
- Kumejima-tsumugi no Sato, Yuimāru-kan
- Kadena Folk Material Hall
- Kuroshima Research Station
- Manko Waterbird & Wetland Center
- Mekaru Family Residence
- Minamidaitō Furusato Culture Center
- Minamidaitō Visitor Center Shima Marugoto Museum
- Minsa Weaving Craft Hall
- Miyakojima City Tropical Plant Garden
- Miyakojima Kaihōkan
- Old Miyaradunchi
- Moromi Folkcraft Museum
- Motobu Town Museum
- Mukashi-kan
- Naha City Museum of History
- Naha City Traditional Arts and Craft Center
- Nakamura Family Residence
- Nakijin Village History and Culture Center
- Neo Park Okinawa
- Nantō Folk Museum
- Oceanic Culture Museum
- Ōhama Nobumoto Memorial Museum
- Okinawa City Street Corner Data Hall
- Okinawa Nature School Museum
- Okinawa Peace Hall
- Okinawa Postal Material Center
- Okinawa Prefectural Buried Cultural Property Center
- Okinawa Prefectural Peace Memorial Museum
- Omoro Botanical Garden
- Onna Village Museum
- Ryūkyū Black Pearl Center
- Ryūkyū Shimpō Newspaper Museum
- Ryukyu Village
- Sakima Art Museum
- Satake Yaeyama Palm Memorial Museum
- Shimamuraya Sightseeing Park Folk Museum
- Shuri Castle Park
- Shuri Ryūsen Traditional Craft Museum
- Tarama Village Furusato Minzoku Gakushūkan
- Tokashiki Village History and Folk Heritage Museum
- Tomigusuku City History and Folk Material Exhibition Room
- Tropical & Subtropical Arboretum
- Tropical Dream Center
- Ueno German Culture Village Kinder House
- Uezu Family Residence
- Uruma City Ishikawa History and Folk Museum
- Uruma City Sea Culture Museum
- Uruma City Yonashiro History and Folk Museum
- Yaese Town Gushikami Museum of History and Folklore
- Yaeyama Peace Memorial Museum
- Yambaru Wildlife Conservation Center, Ufugi Nature Museum
- Yomitan Village Art Museum
- Yomitan Village History and Folklore Museum
- Yonabaru Town Tsunahiki Museum
- Yui Rail Exhibition Hall

In addition to the above, the following appear on the list of member museums of the Okinawa Prefecture Museum Society (沖縄県博物館協会):

- Eisa Museum
- Minamikaze Museum
- Nakagusuku Village Gosamaru Historical Materials Library
- National Theatre Okinawa
- Okinawa Army Hospital Haebaru Bunker No.20

== See also ==
- Japanese museums
- Prefectural museum
- Tourism in Japan
- Culture of Japan
- List of museums
