= Kanazawa Phonograph Museum =

Museum in Kanazawa, Ishikawa, Japan

- 金沢蓄音器館
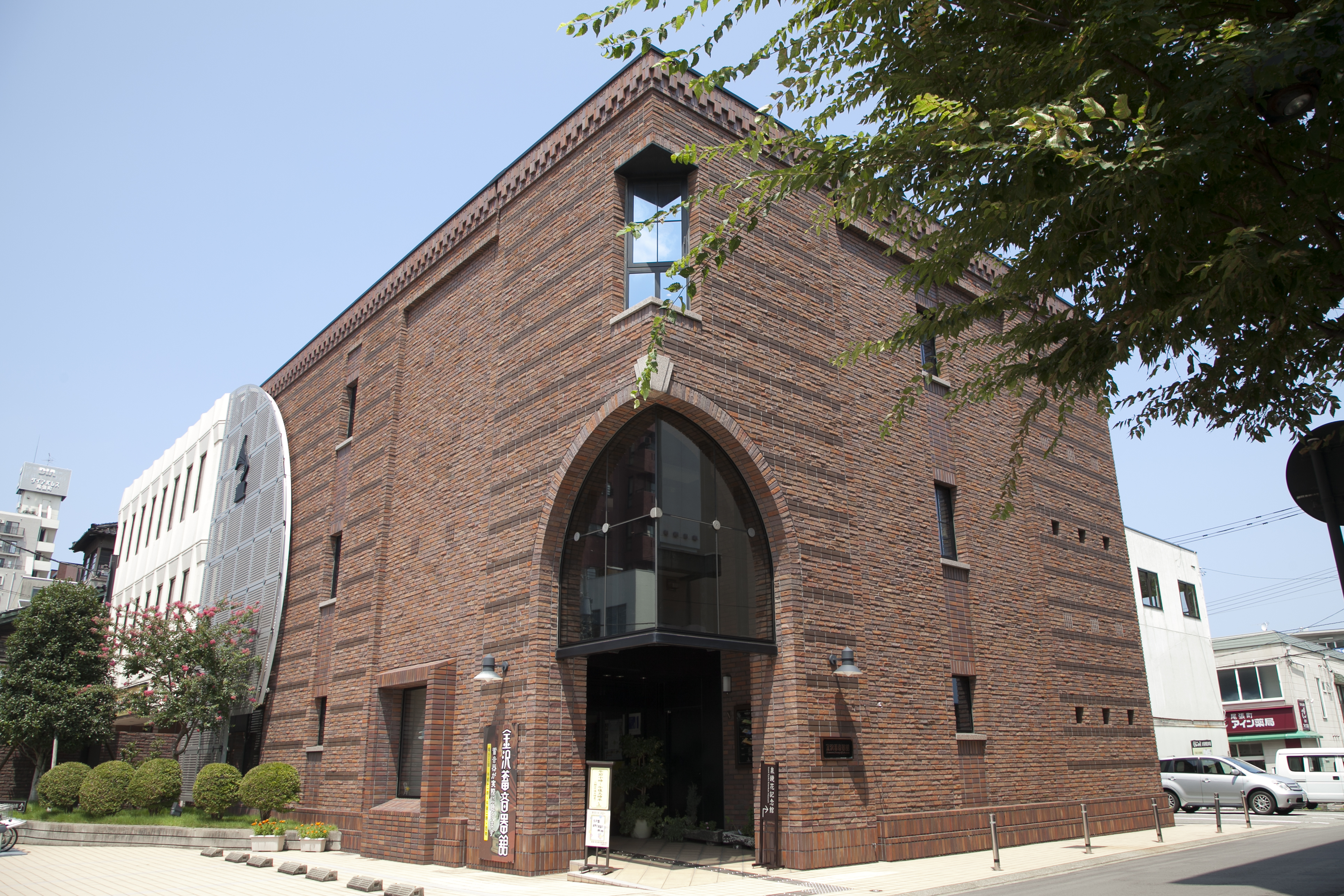
- Established: 2001
- Location: Kanazawa, Ishikawa, Japan
- Coordinates: 36°34′16″N 136°39′47″E
- Type: phonograph museum
- Collection size: 240 (phonographs) and 20,000 (SP records)
- Founder: Hiroshi Yokaichiya
- Owners: Hiroshi Yokaichiya (2001-2003); Noriyuki Yokaichiya (2003-)
- Public transit access: Right loop bus stop #7
- Parking: 5 lots
- Website: Official website

The Kanazawa Phonograph Museum (Japanese: 金沢蓄音器館) is a museum about phonograph located in Kanazawa, Ishikawa Prefecture, Japan.

== History ==
The story of the museum originated from Hiroshi Yokaichiya where he once owned a phonograph shop before World War II. Gradually the popularity of phonographs began to fade away. Since then he used to collect phonographs since the 1970s. He even fixed damaged or broken phonographs before adding them to his collections. Once his collections reached 540 units and 20,000 SP records, he donated them to Kanazawa City Government and the Kanazawa Phonograph Museum was opened in 2001 to display his collections. Yokaichiya died in 2003 and the museum has been operated by his eldest son, Noriyuki Yokaichiya, who continues to find and restore phonographs.

== Architecture ==
The museum is housed in a 3-story building with a music shop on the ground floor. The museum was built using red bricks and designed with the old style of the neighborhood architectural style.

== Exhibitions ==
The museum features 240 phonographs and 20,000 SP records from 19th to 20th century which mostly are still usable and demonstrations are being played three times a day at 11:00 a.m., 2:00 p.m. and 4:00 p.m., each at a duration of 30 minutes. Some of the notable collections are Edison Amberola Model 30, Edison Diamond Disc, Columbia Viva-Tonal "Portable", Victor Credenza Console, HMV Model 194 1927, EMG Expert Senior 1935 and Brunswick 1925. It features the history of phonographs since Thomas Edison era in 1877. Explanation to the collections are in Japanese with brochures in English. It also features a pianola which plays music every Sunday at 10:30 a.m., 1:30 p.m. and 3:30 p.m. which was built in Boston, United States in 1927. Visitors are able to play some of the instruments.

== Activities ==
The museum also regularly hosts musical concerts and hands-on classes.

== Transportation ==
The museum is accessible within walking distance from right loop bus stop #7 departing from Kanazawa Station of West Japan Railway Company.

== See also ==
- List of museums in Japan
