= Museum of Tin Toys =

Toy museum in Yokohama, Japan

Coordinates: 35°26′17.93″N 139°39′15.82″E

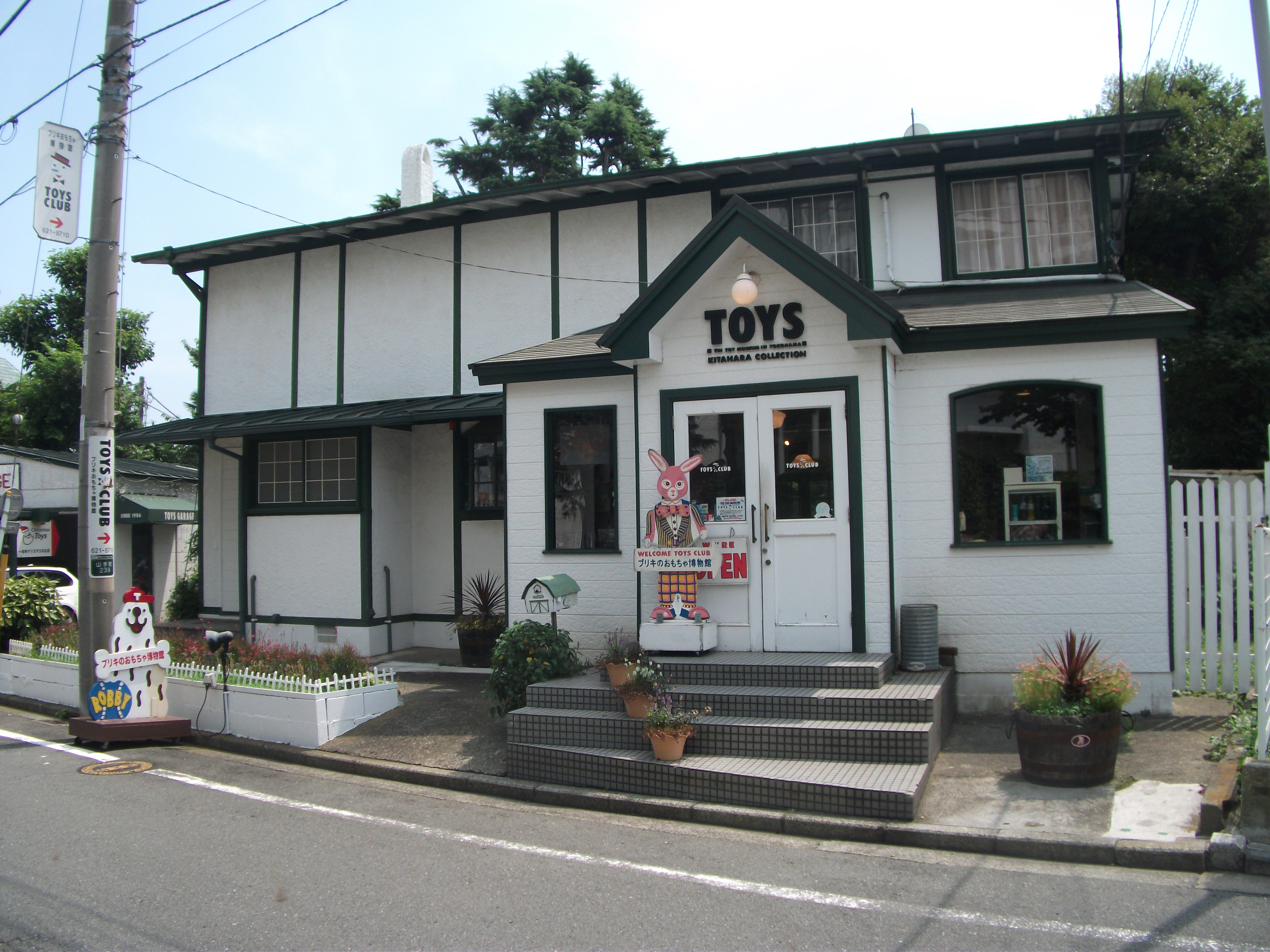
- Location: Yokohama, Japan
- Type: Toy museum
- Website: www.toysclub.co.jp

Museum of Tin Toys (ブリキのおもちゃ博物館, Buriki no Omocha Hakubutsukan) is a museum in Yokohama, Kanagawa Prefecture, Japan. It was founded by Teruhisa Kitahara, a prominent tin toy collector, in 1986. In addition to the museum's permanent exhibition in Yokohama, Japan, it also has created a changing collection in Haneda Airport in Tokyo.
