= Ginoza Village Museum =

Museum in Ginoza, Okinawa, Japan

- 宜野座村立博物館
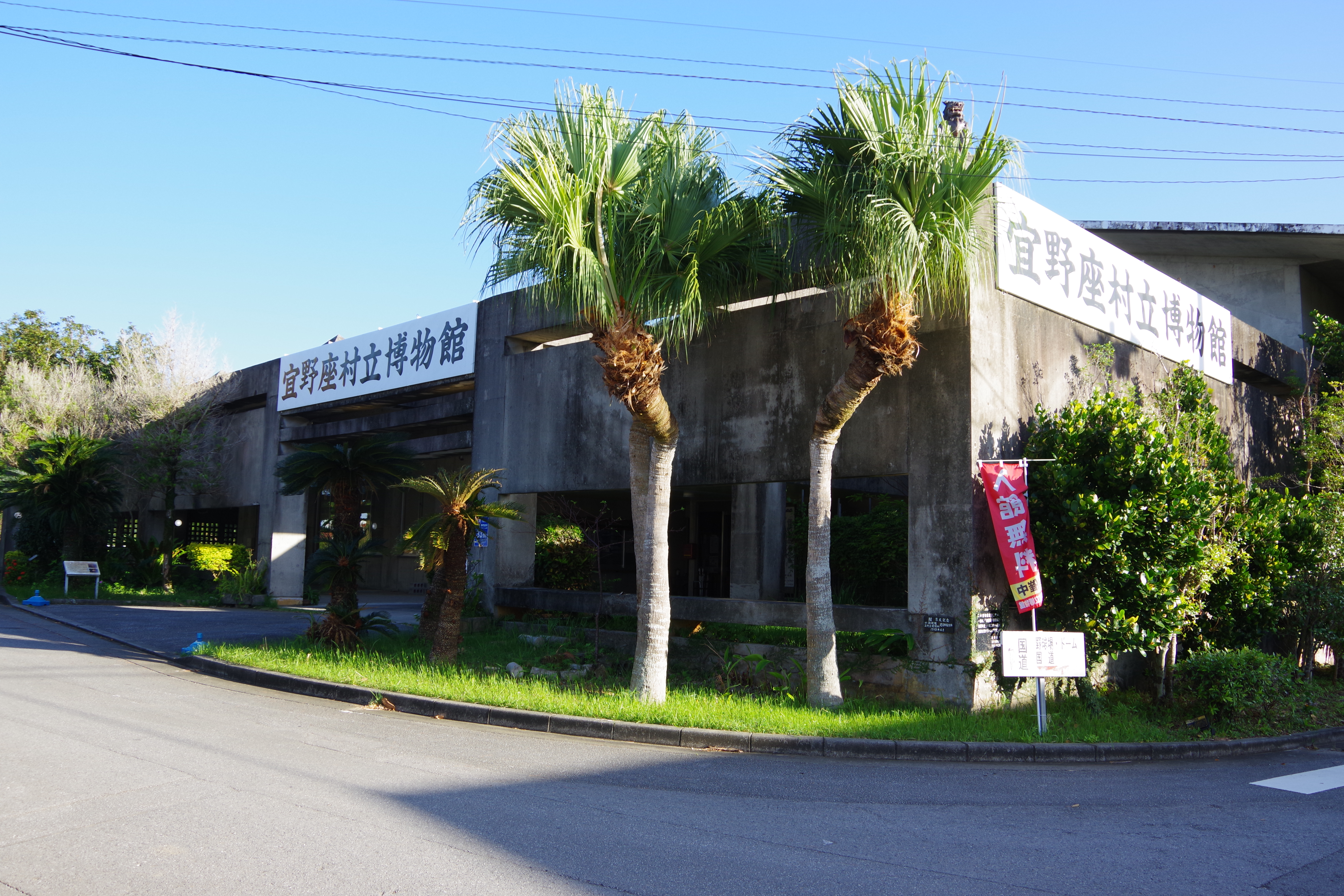
- Interactive map of the Ginoza Village Museum area

General information
- Location: 232 Ginoza, Ginoza, Okinawa Prefecture, Japan
- Coordinates: 26°28′58″N 127°58′22″E
- Opened: 1994

Website
- Official website (ja)

Ginoza Village Museum (宜野座村立博物館, Ginoza Sonritsu Hakubutsukan) opened in Ginoza, Okinawa Prefecture, Japan in 1994. The displays relate to the history and folkways of the area.

== See also ==
- Nago Museum
