= Historical Museum of Urahoro =

Museum in Urahoro, Hokkaido, Japan

- 浦幌町立博物館
- Interactive map of the Historical Museum of Urahoro area

General information
- Location: 16-1 Sakura-machi, Urahoro, Hokkaido, Japan
- Coordinates: 42°48′35″N 143°39′29″E
- Opened: 1 June 1969

Website
- Official website (ja)

The Historical Museum of Urahoro (浦幌町立博物館, Urahoro Chōritsu Hakubutsukan) first opened in Urahoro, Hokkaido, Japan in 1969, as the 浦幌町郷土博物館 (Urahoro-chō Kyōdo Hakubutsukan). The museum relocated to a shared facility with the town library and assumed its current name in 1999. The permanent displays document the natural history, archaeology, history, and culture of the area, including fossils from the Cretaceous–Paleogene boundary, Jōmon and Satsumon ceramics, and Ainu materials.

== See also ==
- Kushiro City Museum
