= Chōkaidō Museum =

Museum of art in Yokkaichi, Mie, Japan

- 澄懐堂美術館
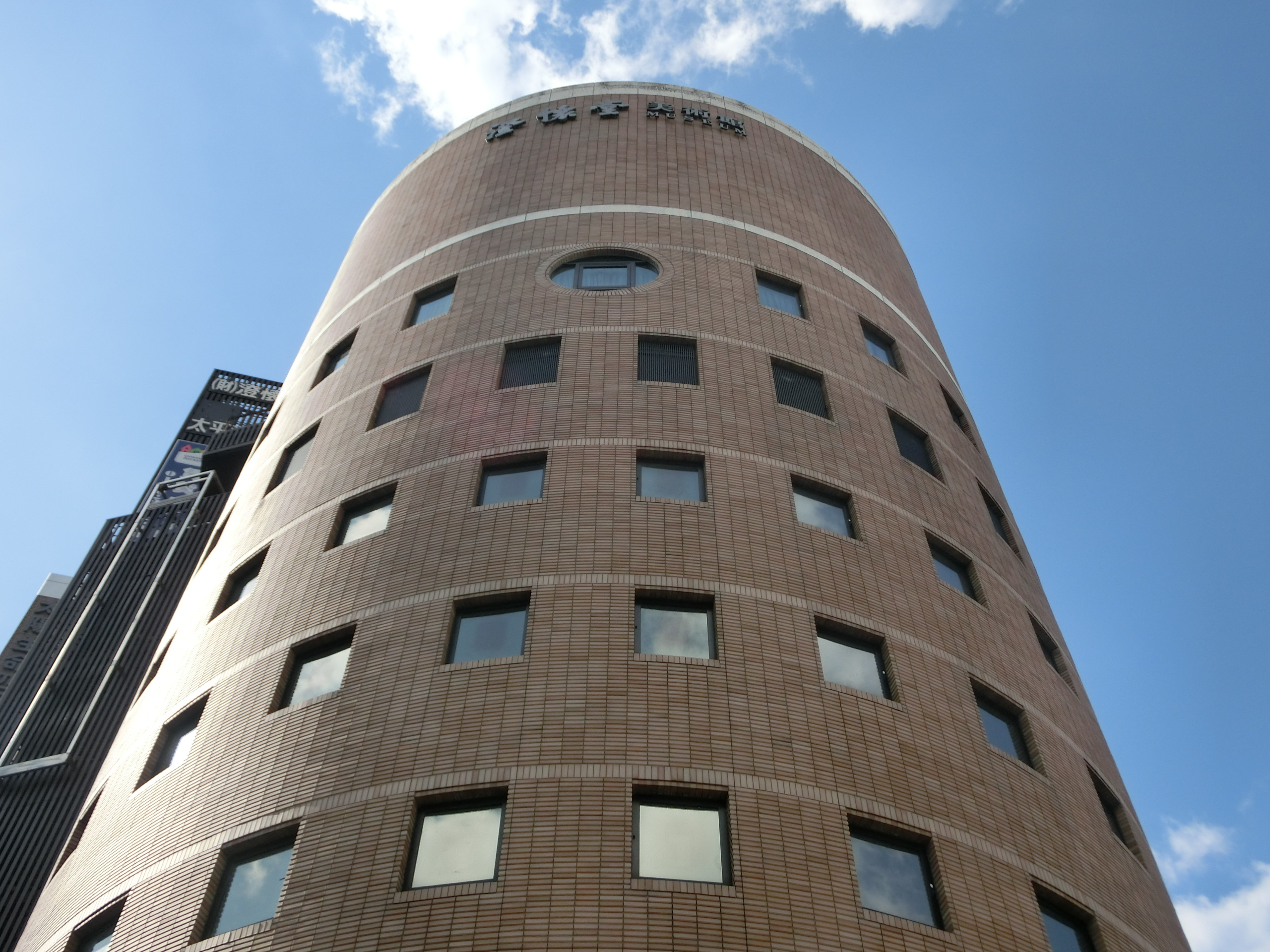
- Interactive map of the Chōkaidō Museum area

General information
- Location: 2001 Suizawa-chō, Yokkaichi, Mie Prefecture, Japan
- Coordinates: 34°58′36″N 136°28′42″E
- Opened: April 1994

Website
- Official website (ja)

Chōkaidō Museum (澄懐堂美術館, Chōkaidō Bijutsukan) opened in Yokkaichi, Mie Prefecture, Japan in 1994, reopening in a new site in the city in 2017. The collection, built up by Yamamoto Teijirō, focuses on Chinese calligraphy and paintings from the Song to the Qing.

== See also ==
- Yokkaichi Municipal Museum
