= Takamatsu Art Museum =

- 高松市美術館
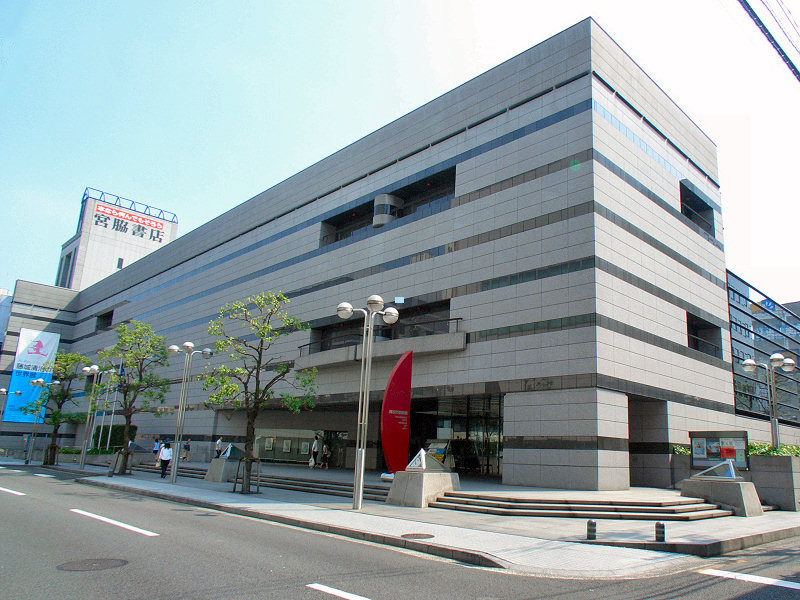
- Interactive map of the Takamatsu Art Museum area

General information
- Location: 10-4 Konya-machi, Takamatsu, Kagawa Prefecture, Japan
- Coordinates: 34°20′38″N 134°02′57″E
- Opened: 6 August 1988

Website
- homepage

The Takamatsu Art Museum (高松市美術館, Takamatsu-shi Bijutsukan) opened in Takamatsu, Kagawa Prefecture, Japan, in 1988. The collection, totalling over 1,700 works, has three principal strands: post-war Japanese art, modern and contemporary world art, and the arts and crafts of Kagawa Prefecture. The Museum's predecessor institution, Takamatsu Bijutsukan (高松美術館), opened in Ritsurin Garden in 1949.

== See also ==
- The Kagawa Museum
