= Toshiba Science Institute =

Science museum in Kawasaki, Japan

Toshiba Science Museum was a science museum in Kawasaki, Kanagawa, Japan. Admission to this museum was free, but reservations were optional if one needed an English-speaking guide.

On June 29, 2024 the museum closed to the public.
