= Peace museum =

Museum documenting peace initiatives

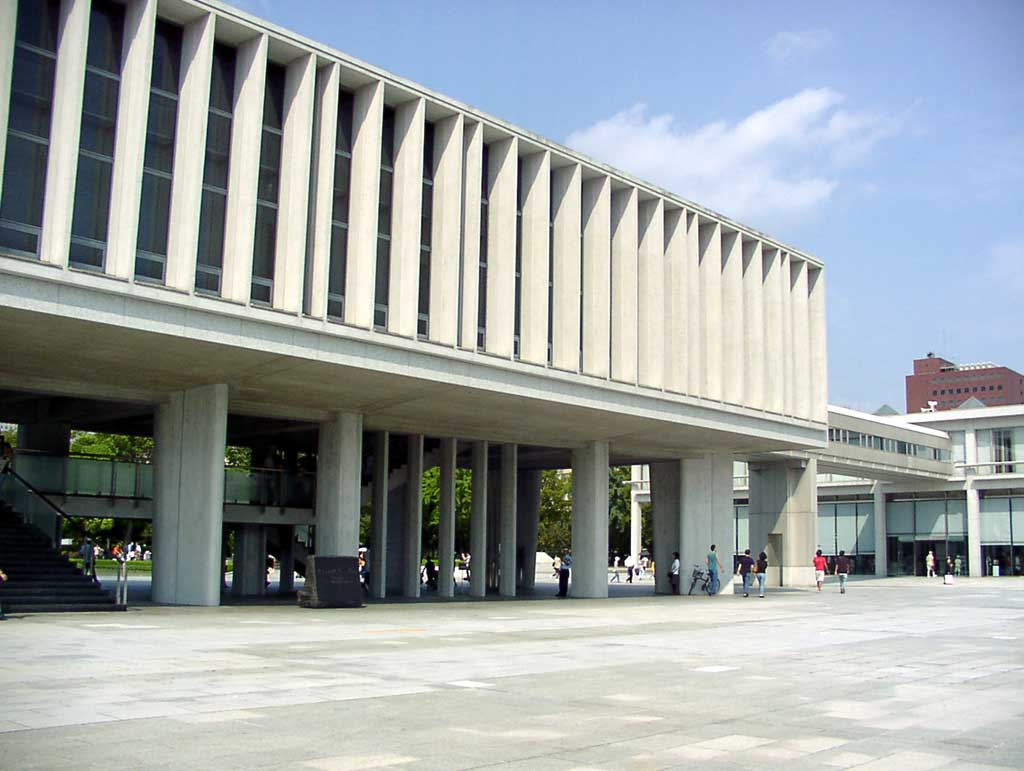
The Hiroshima Peace Memorial Museum in Hiroshima, Japan.

A peace museum is a museum that documents historical peace initiatives. Many peace museums also provide advocacy programs for nonviolent conflict resolution. This may include conflicts at the personal, regional or international level.

== Peace museums around the world ==
- Bansei Tokkō Peace Museum, Kagoshima Prefecture, Japan
- Canadian Peace Museum
- Children's Peace Pavilion – Independence, Missouri, United States
- Chiran Peace Museum for Kamikaze Pilots, Kagoshima, Japan
- Fukuromachi Elementary School Peace Museum - near the peace park, across the Motuyasu river
- Himeyuri Peace Museum
- Hiroshima National Peace Memorial Hall for the Atomic Bomb Victims – Hiroshima, Japan; inside the peace park
- Hiroshima Peace Memorial Museum – Hiroshima, Japan; inside the Hiroshima Peace Memorial Park
- Honkawa Elementary School Peace Museum – Hiroshima, Japan; near the peace park, across the Honkawa river
- IJzertoren – Diksmuide, West Flanders, Belgium
- The International Peace Museum – Dayton, Ohio, United States
- Kawasaki Peace Museum
- Kyoto Museum for World Peace – Kyoto, Japan
- Mémorial de Caen – Caen, Normandy, France
- Nagasaki Atomic Bomb Museum – Nagasaki, Japan
- Norwegian Nobel Institute – Oslo, Norway
- Okinawa Prefectural Peace Memorial Museum, Japan
- Osaka International Peace Center
- Peace Museum – Bradford, West Yorkshire, England, United Kingdom
- Peace Museum of Saitama, Japan
- Tehran Peace Museum
- The Peace Museum – Chicago, Illinois, United States (closed)
- World Peace Museum (a travelling exhibition)
- Yi Jun Peace Museum - The Hague, Netherlands
- Yokaren Peace Memorial Museum, Japan

== See also ==
- International Network of Museums for Peace
- Lists of museums
