= Park-e Shahr (Tehran) =

Public park in Tehran, Iran

City Park
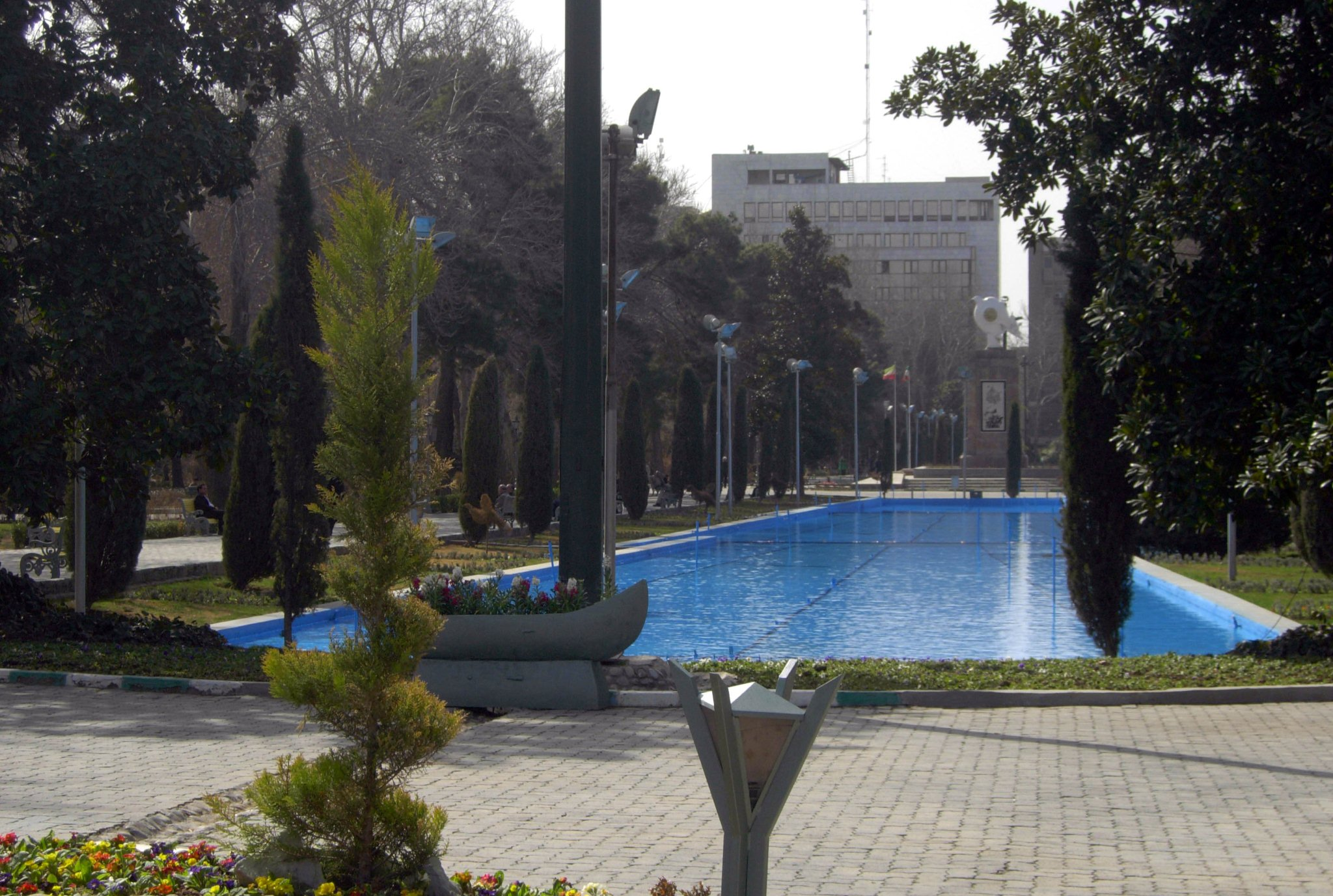
- View of City Park in 2008
- Interactive map of City Park
- Type: Urban park
- Location: District 12, Tehran, Iran
- Coordinates: 35°41′N 51°25′E
- Area: 26 hectares (64 acres)
- Created: 1953
- Owner: Tehran municipality
- Operator: Tehran municipality
- Open: 24 hours
- Public transit: Metro and bus; see below

Park-e Shahr (Persian: پارک شهر, lit. 'City Park'), with its 26 hectares (64 acres), is an urban park located in central Tehran, Iran.

== History ==
The area of the current park was once a dense and populated neighborhood called Sangelaj, one of the five districts in Safavid and Mid-Qajar Tehran. It was located at the northwestern corner of the capital. People with less income inhabited there while no city gate served their huge neighborhood. In 1867, Naser al-Din Shah Qajar ordered the expansion of the city with the demolition of old fortifications and construction of a modern city plan but Sangelaj remained neglected.

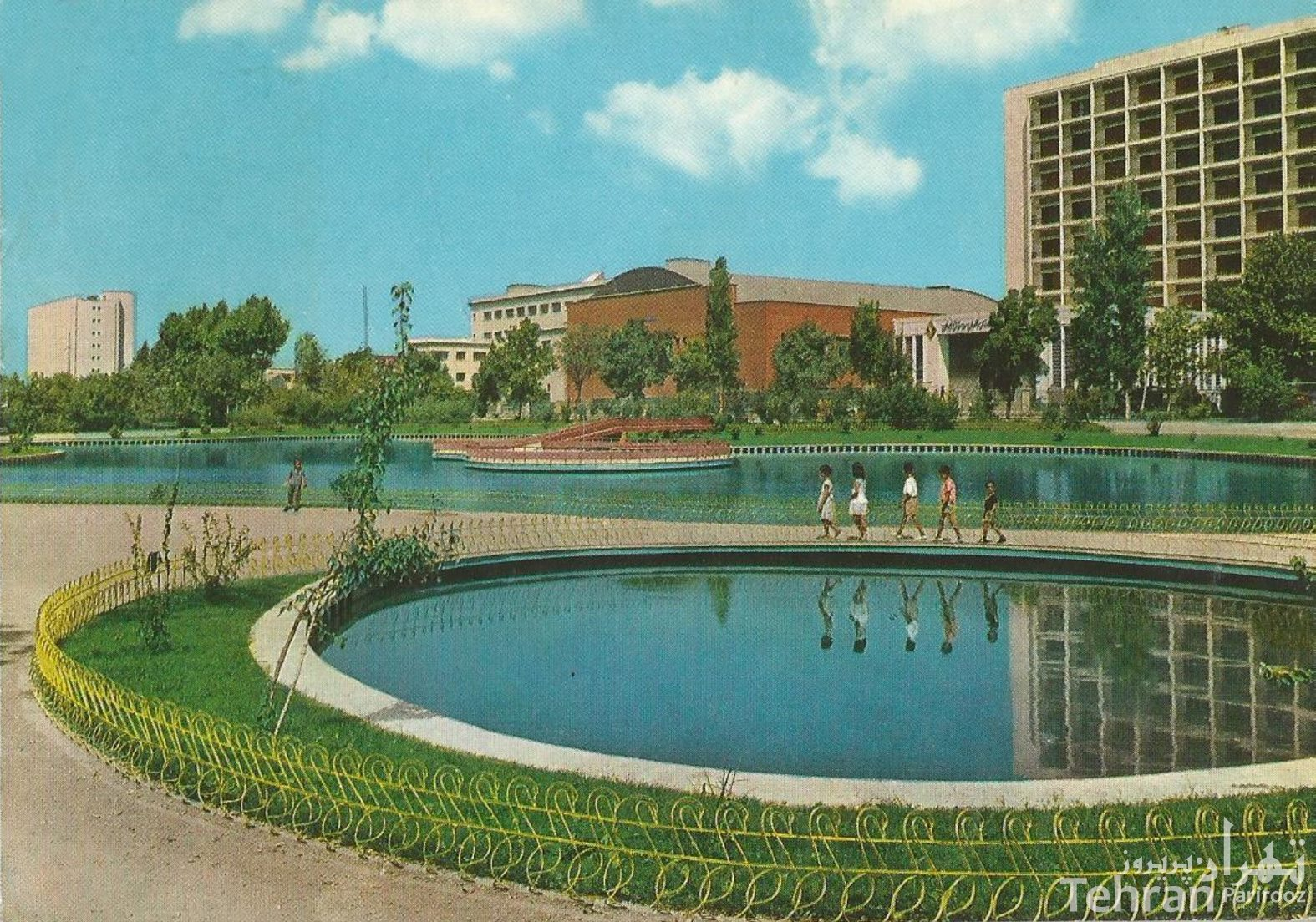
Park-e Shahr in 1965

During Reza Shah's reign, all properties within Sangelaj were either bought or confiscated from Qajar dissidents. After bulldozing the area, it was proposed that the land become a public park and some trees were planted. At the same time, another nearby barren land which was used for military drills was taken into consideration as a park. Trees were planted there and it was named the National Garden. In 1930s, the latter area was chosen as a governmental area (see National Garden, Tehran) and Eventually, in 1959, Park-e Shahr was officially opened to public.

== Structures and facilities ==
=== Recreational and sports facilities ===
Recreational and sports facilities in the park:

- Amphitheatre
- Exercise machines
- Fountains
- Playgrounds
- Restaurants and snack bars
- Sports venue
- Swimming pool

=== Central Library ===
The Central Library was opened in 1961. In 2019, Tehran municipality purchased new equipment for the library.

=== Aquarium ===
The public aquarium in the park features fish such as lung fish, arowana, aba aba, stingray, koi and cafe.

=== Bird Garden ===
The Bird garden in the park is home to birds such as Budgerigar, Duck, Partridge, Peafowl, Rosy-faced lovebird and weero.

=== Peace Museum ===
The Tehran Peace Museum is located at the northern gate of the park. The Tehran Peace Museum is a member of the International Network of Museums for Peace and the main objective of the museum is to promote a culture of peace through raising awareness about the devastating consequences of war, with a focus on the health and environmental impacts of chemical weapons.

== Transportation ==
=== Public transport ===
People can easily reach the park via Tehran metro. Khomeini metro station is located near the park in Toopkhaneh Square. Also, Park-e Shahr bus station is located next to the city park.

== Gallery ==
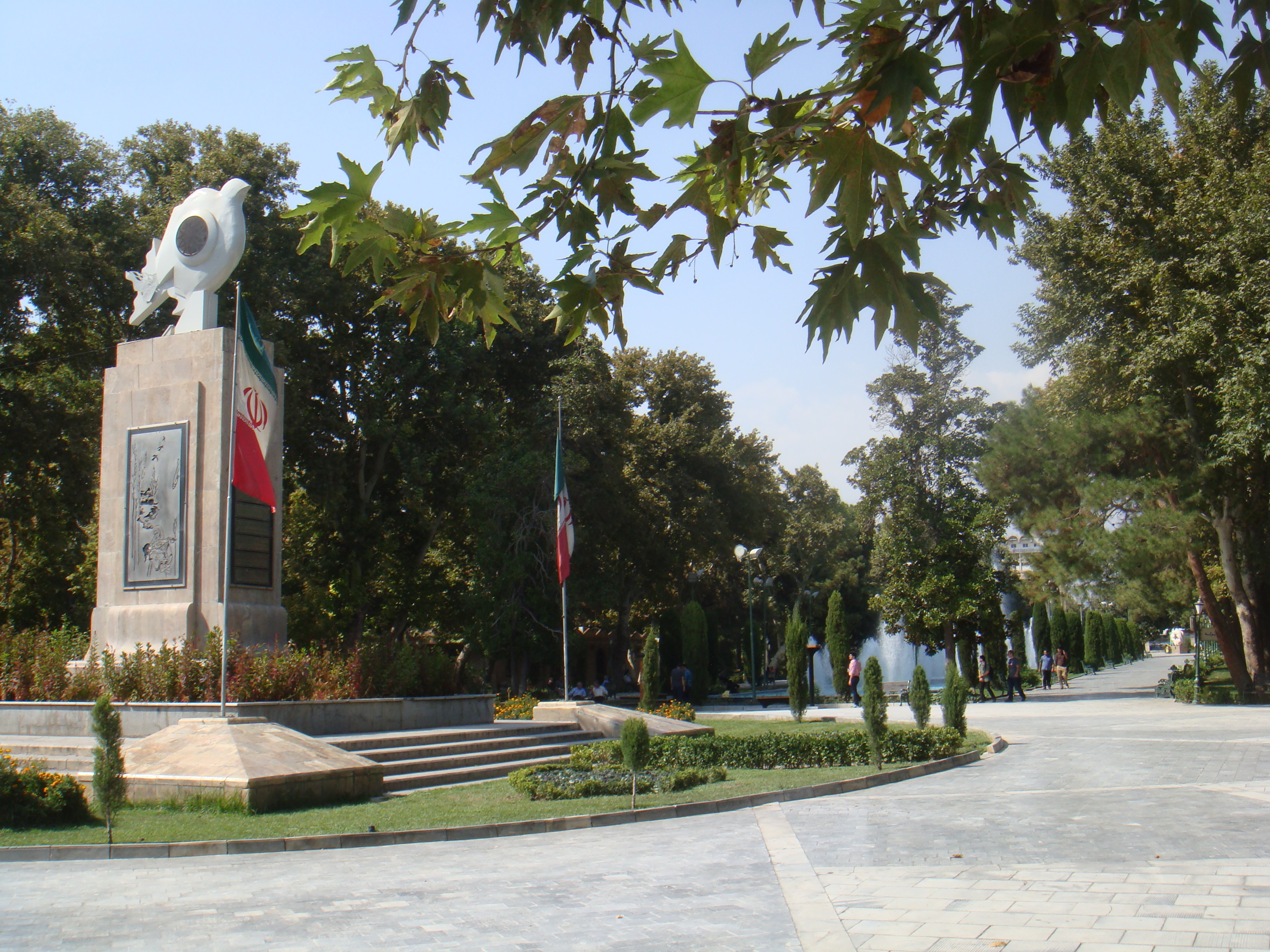

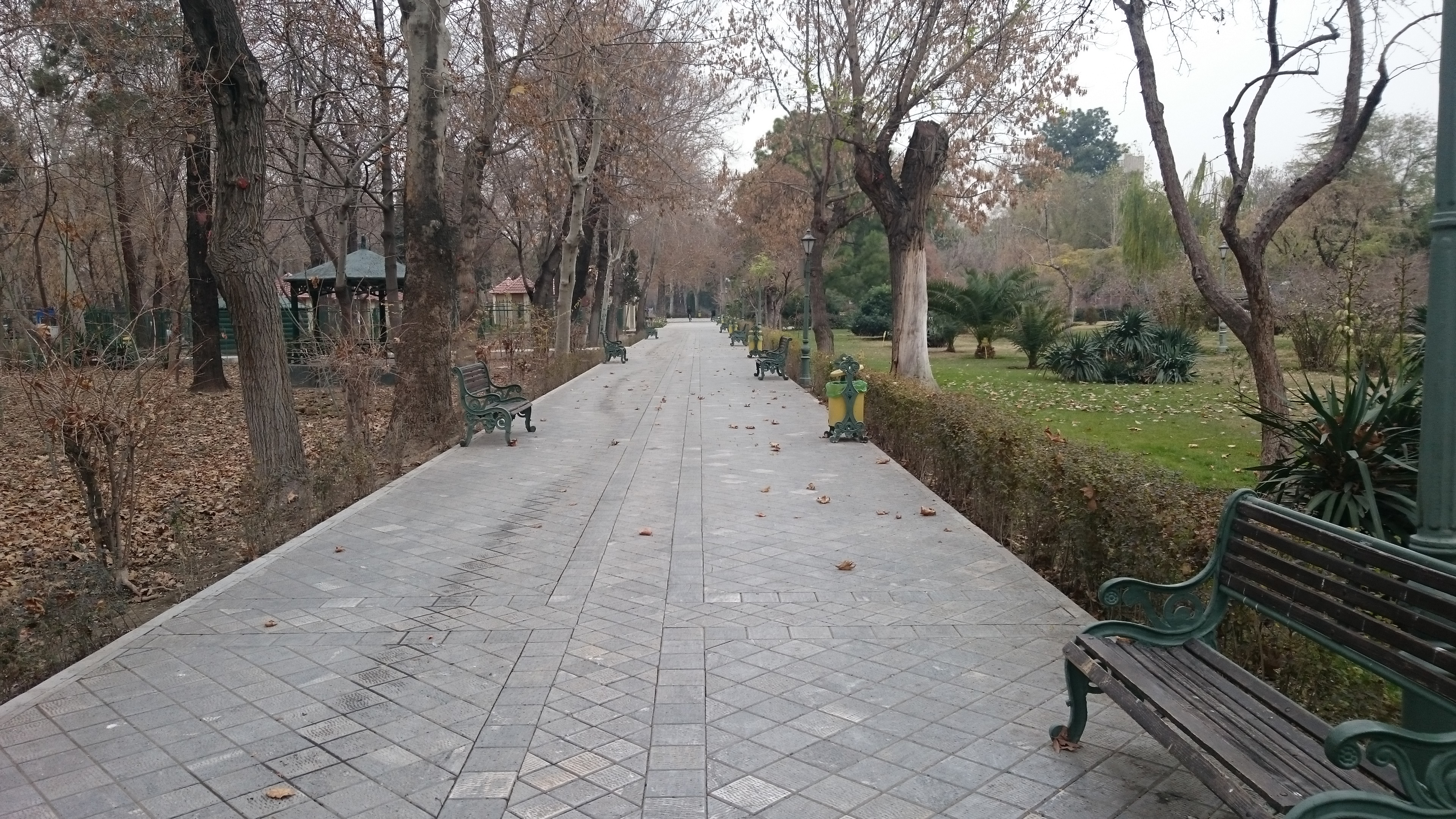

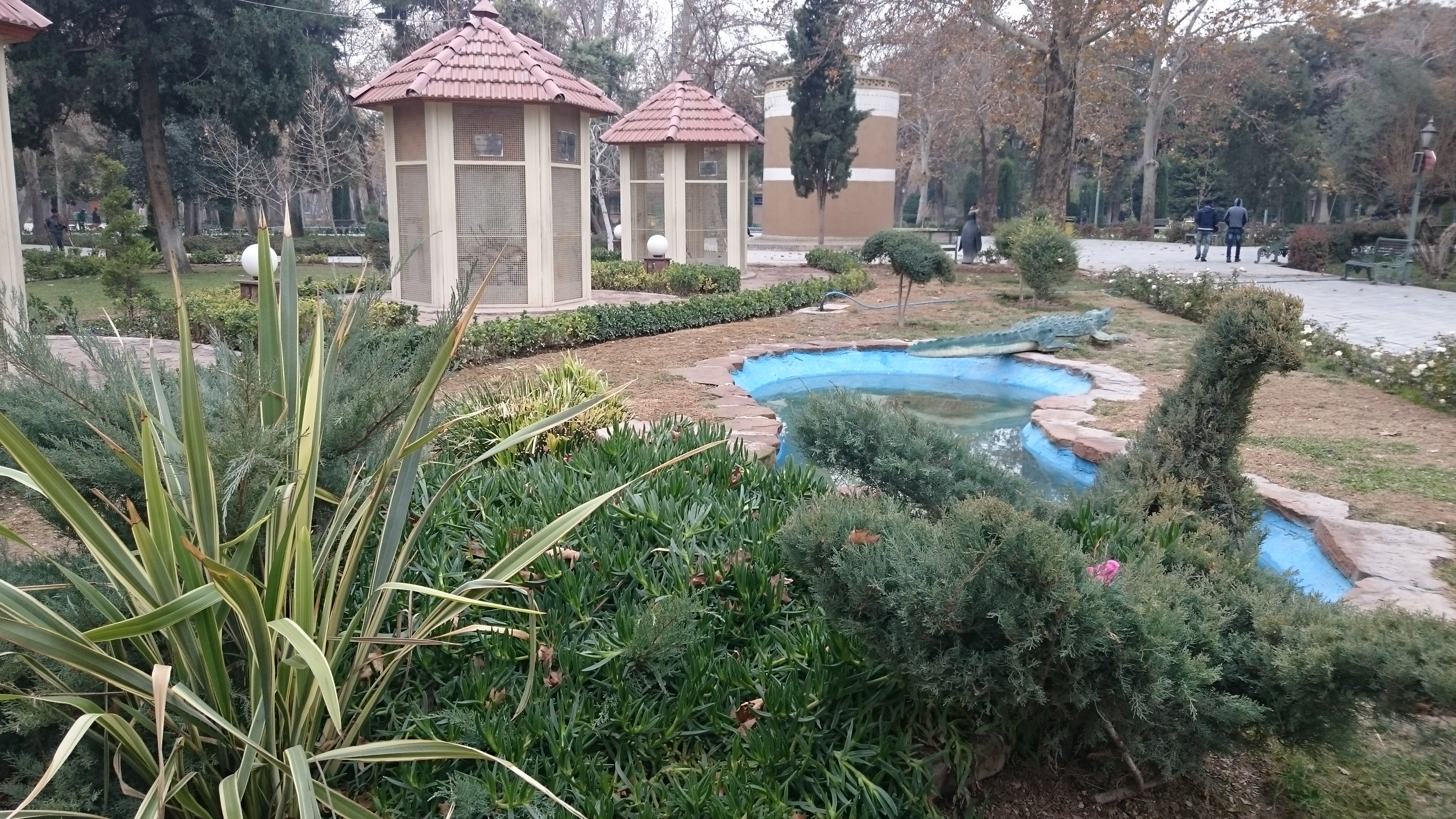

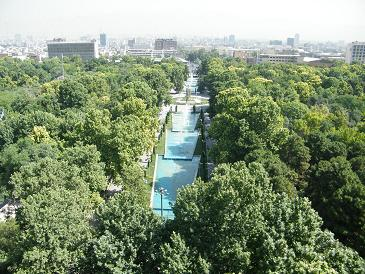

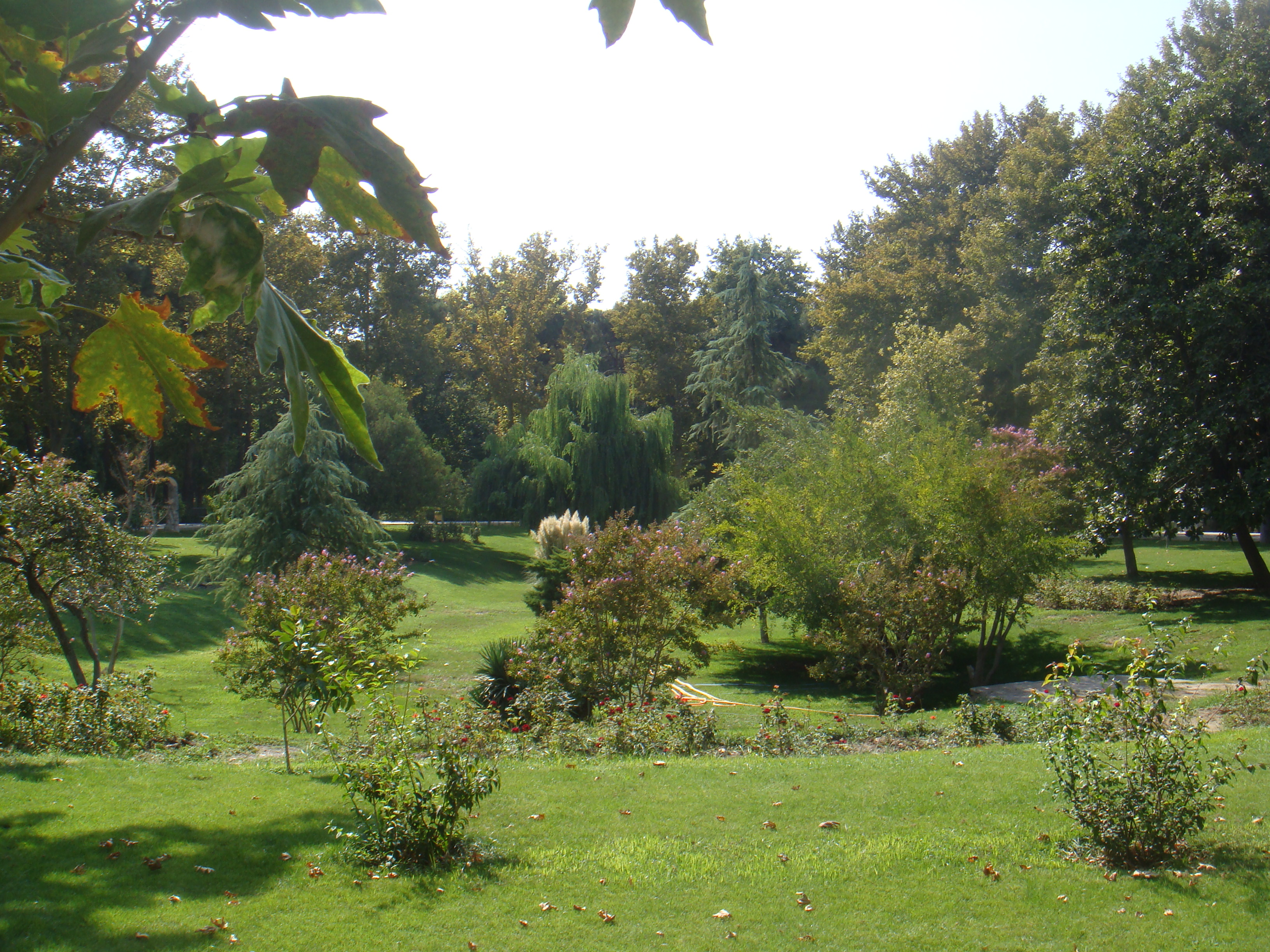

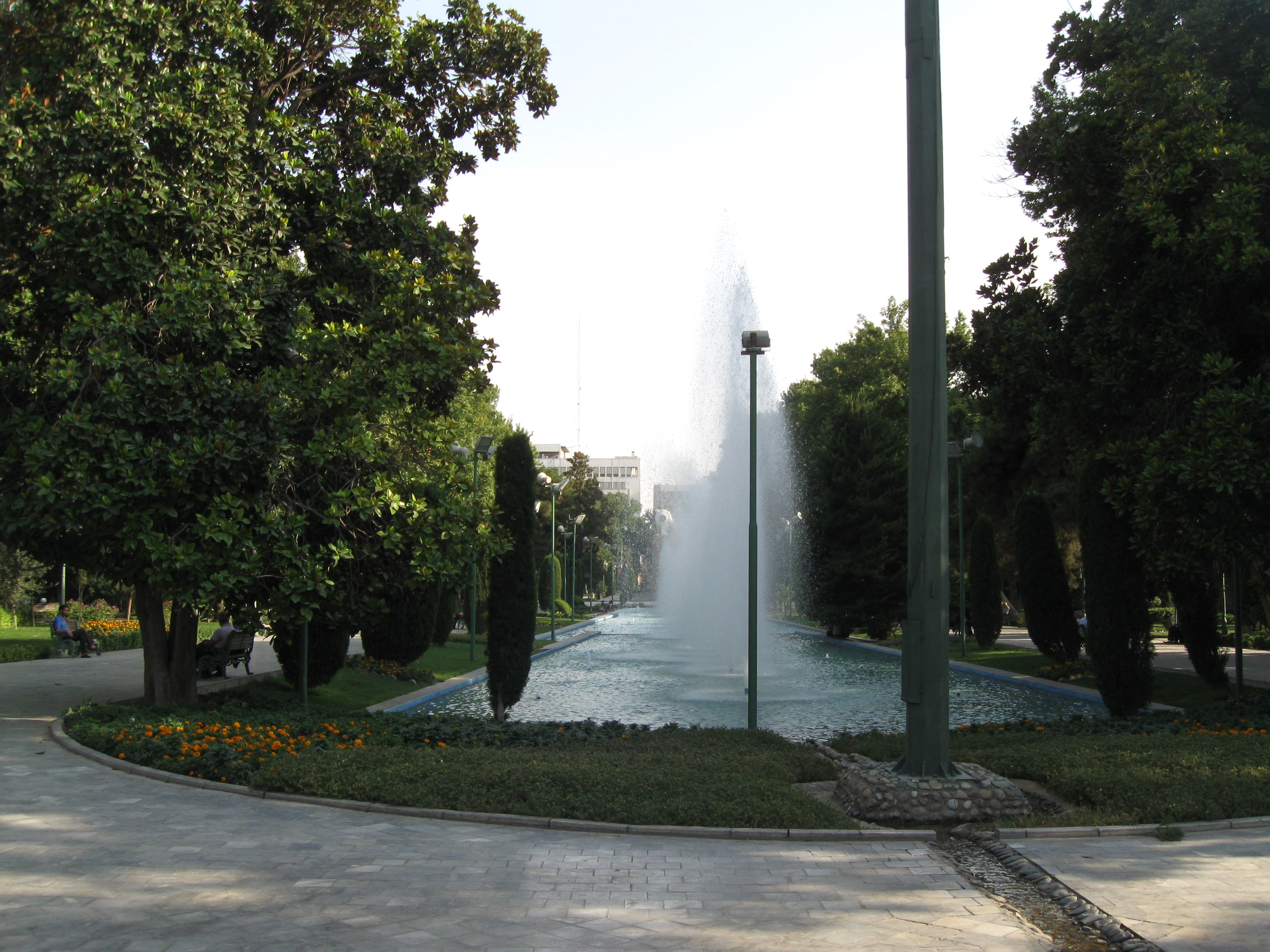

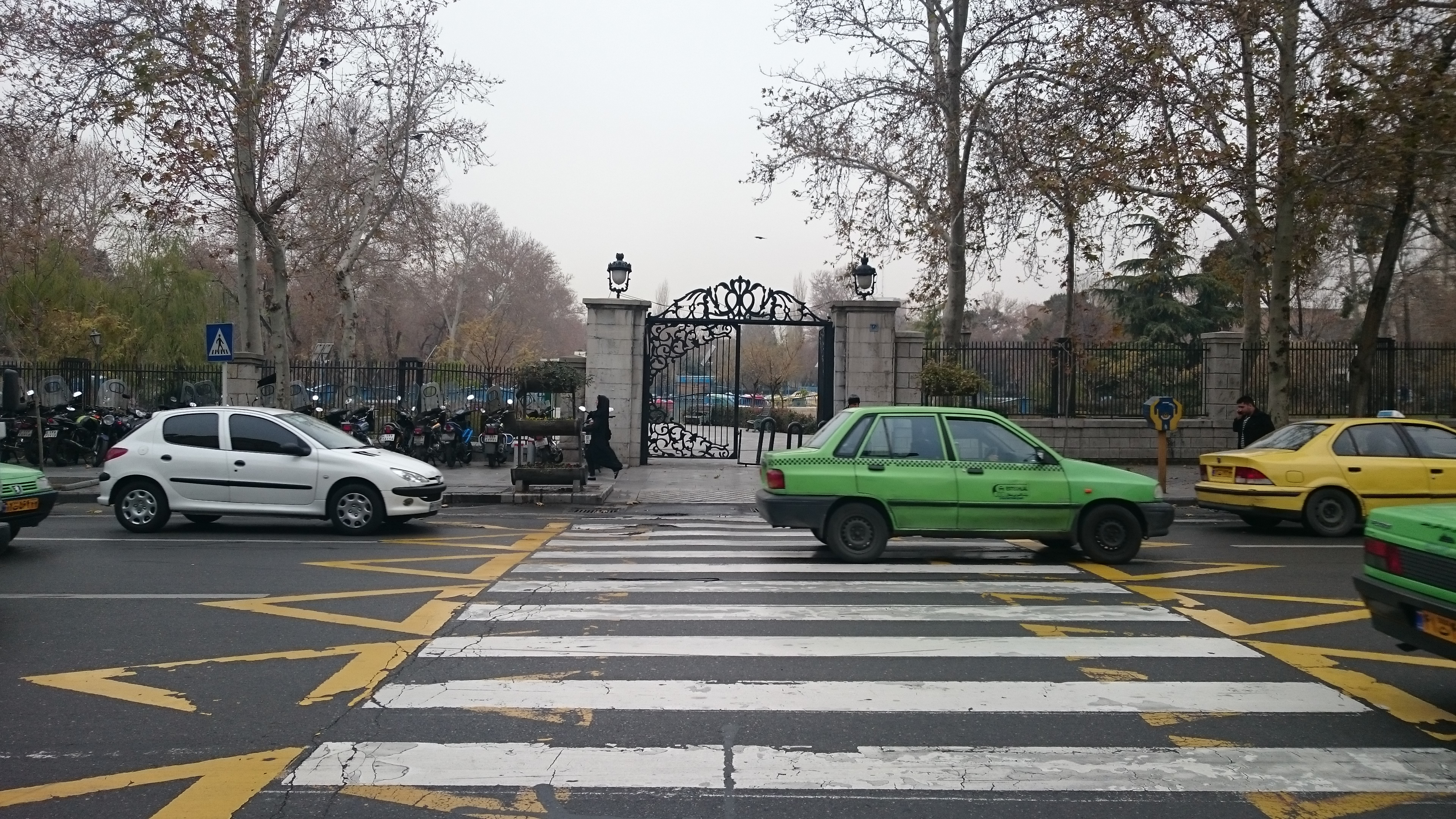

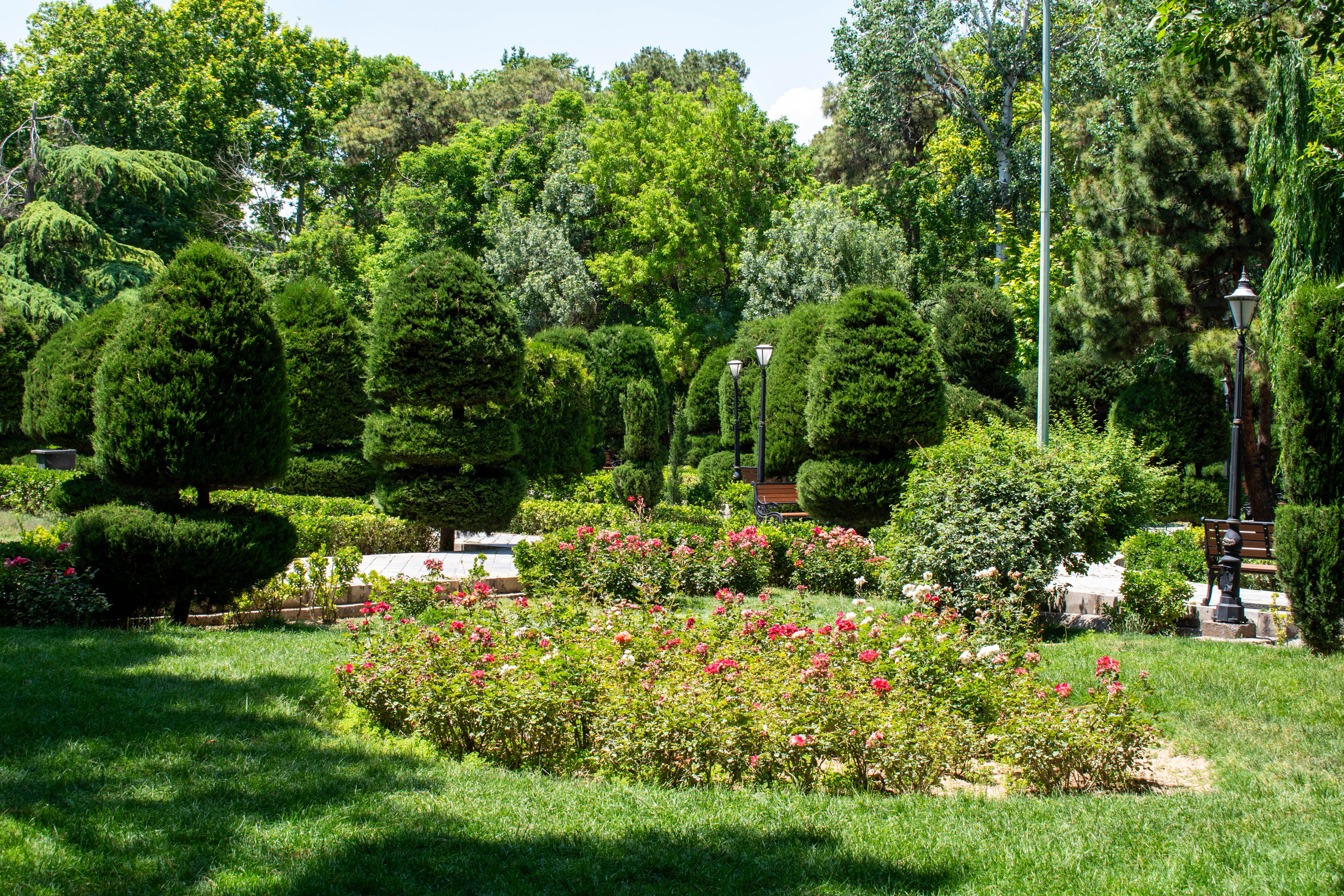

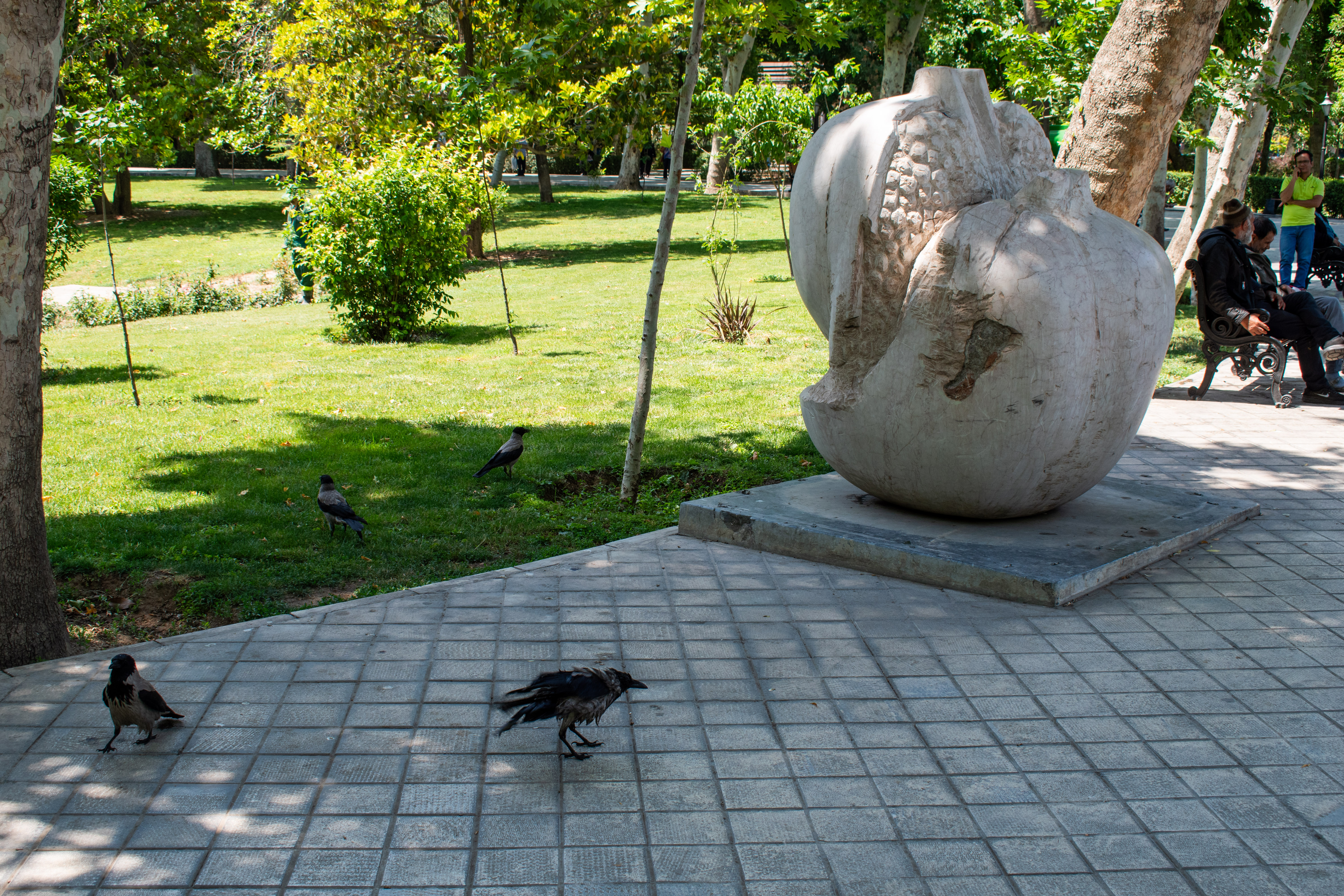

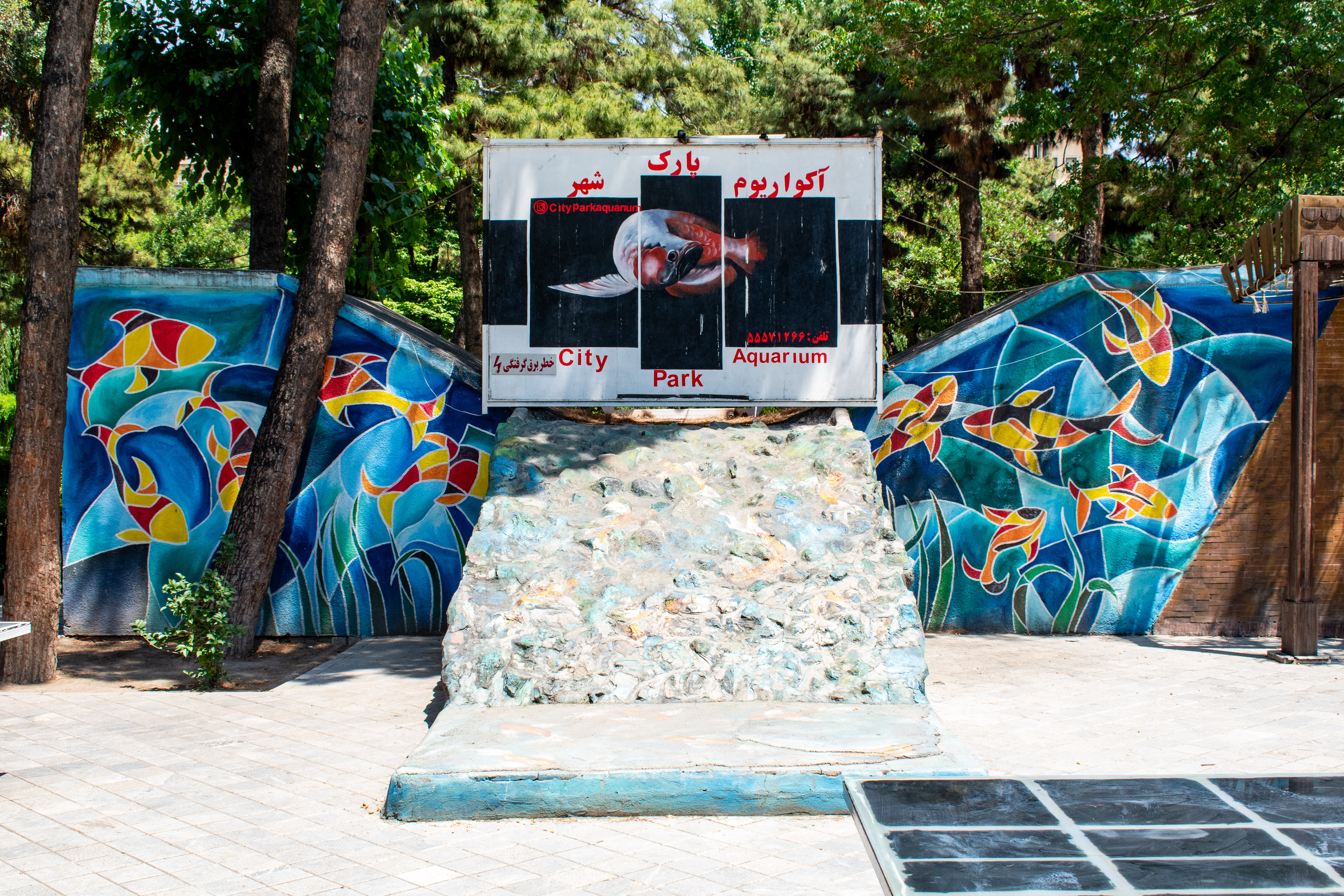

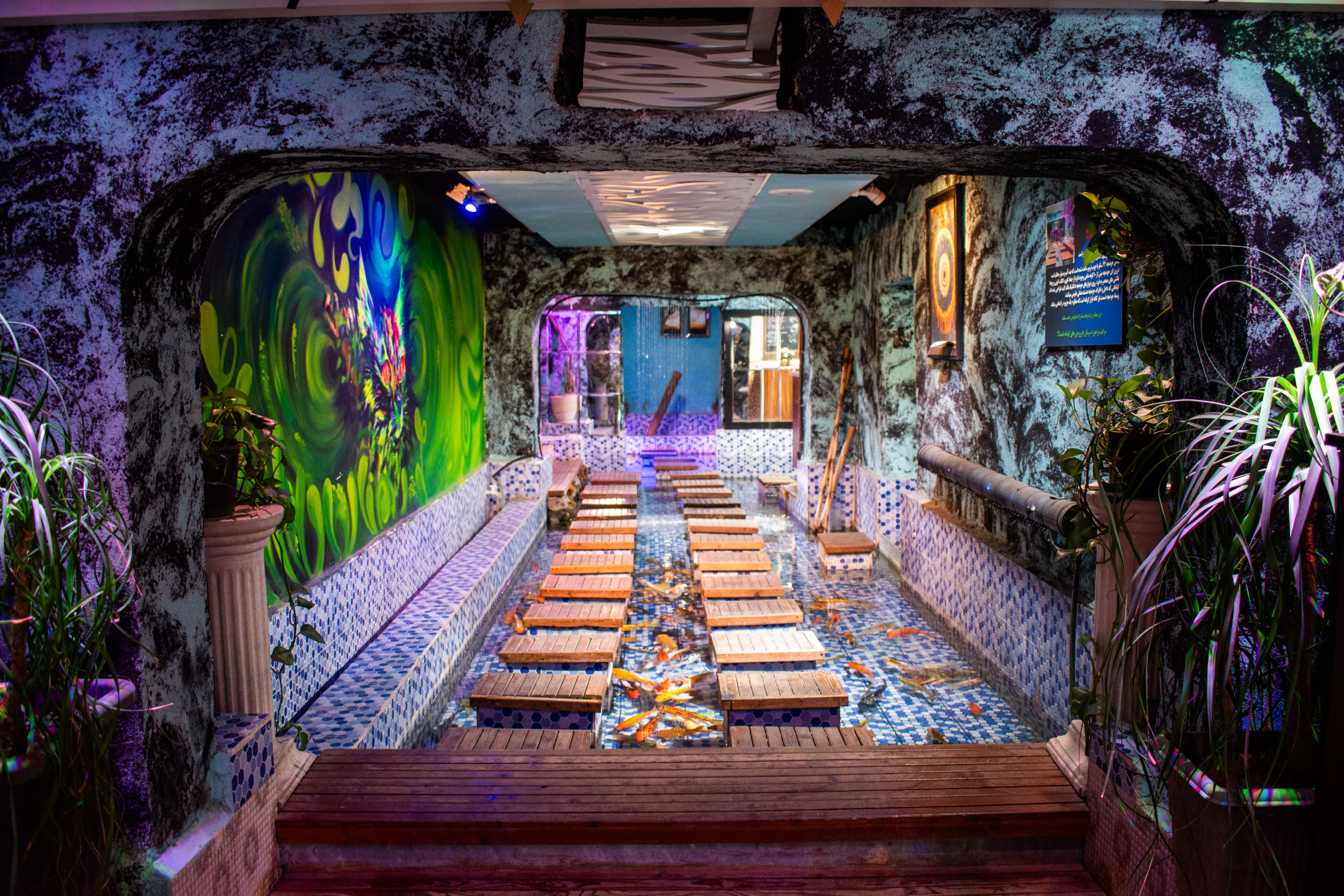
