= Saturday Morning Flashback =

Saturday Morning Flashback is a program airing from 9 am until 12 noon (Central Time) on Saturday mornings on Chicago radio station WXRT. It has aired continually since 1985. The show, once a four-hour program hosted by former WXRT DJ Wendy Rice, was reduced to three hours after her departure. The show is now hosted by either Johnny Mars or Annalisa Parziale, on a rotating basis. Parziale joined the rotation in August 2022, replacing host Richard Milne several months after his resignation from the station. Parziale’s first show, on August 6, 2022, covered 1973.

Previously, the program had featured contributions from several other WXRT DJs, including Frank E. Lee, Lin Brehmer, and Marty Lennartz (who portrays Chicago's hometown movie critic, The Regular Guy), but in recent years these contributions have ended. Each week, Saturday Morning Flashback highlights the key music and cultural events encompassing a single year from the rock and roll era. The years covered range from 1967 to the late 2000s, with new years gradually added in chronological order. Each year is typically featured once every six to nine months, but the choices fit no predictable pattern. Since 2021, some shows have been split between two years, with each year receiving 90 minutes of coverage. For example, the June 25, 2022, episode, was a split show covering the years 2007 and 2008, hosted by Johnny Mars.

Show playlists are posted at the station’s Audacy-hosted webpage and on social media after each show.

On the April 1, 2006, episode, WXRT announced that after 21 years, Saturday Morning Flashback was airing its final show. This "finale" featured ads for XRT's new Saturday morning programming, including a radio version of Fox's hit TV show "24." This turned out to be an elaborate April Fool's Day hoax (one of many that the station had done over the years), and programming director Norm Winer addressed listeners at the end of the show to assure them that this popular program would not be going away any time soon.
