= Kawasaki Peace Museum =

- 川崎市平和館
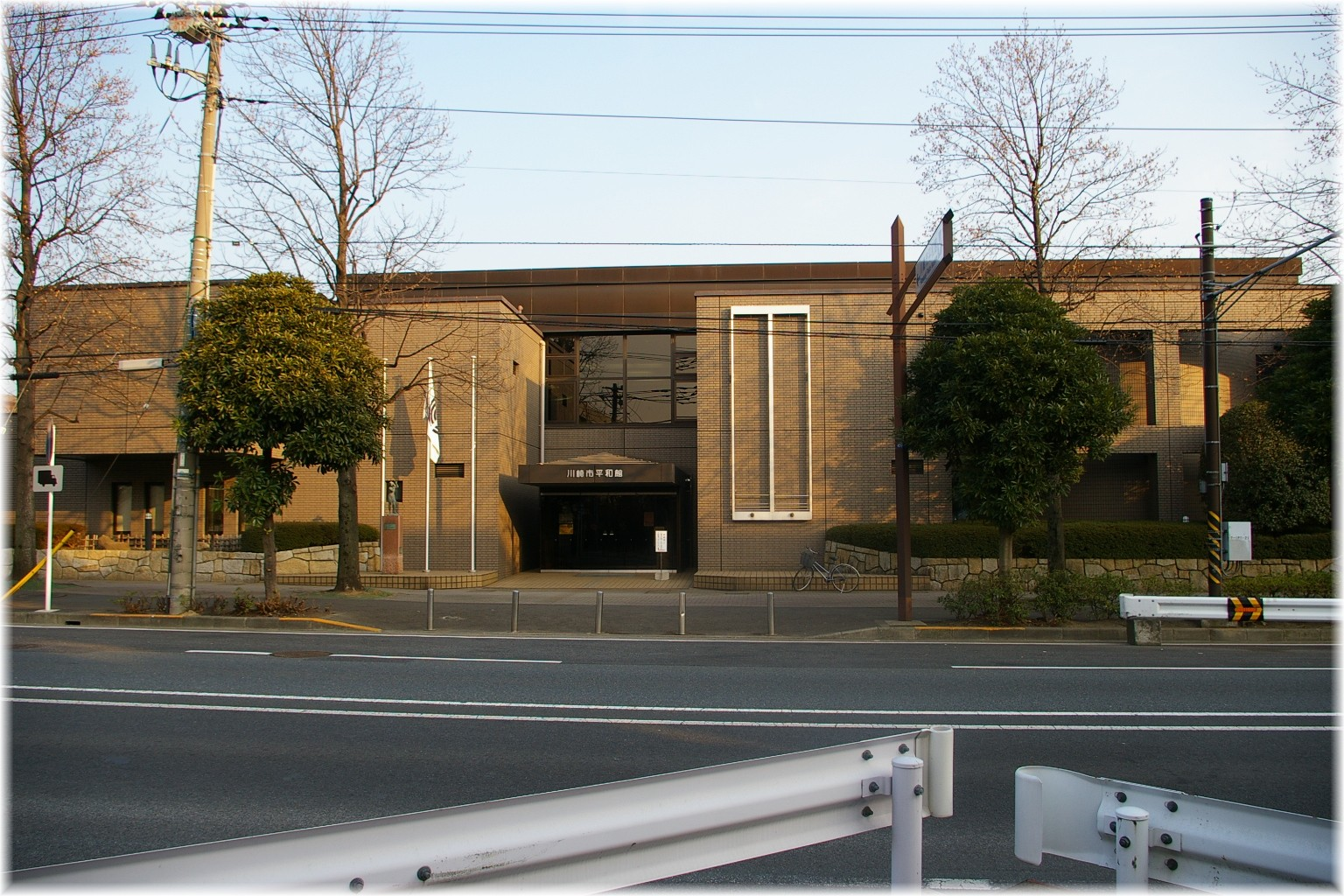
- Interactive map of the Kawasaki Peace Museum area

General information
- Location: 33-1 Kizukisumiyoshi-chō, Nakahara-ku, Kawasaki, Kanagawa Prefecture, Japan
- Coordinates: 35°34′07″N 139°39′31″E
- Opened: April 1992

Website
- Official website (ja)

Kawasaki Peace Museum (川崎市平和館, Kawasaki-shi Heiwa-kan) is a peace museum that opened in Kawasaki, Kanagawa Prefecture, Japan, in 1992. The permanent display adopts a holistic approach, presenting poverty, hunger, and environmental issues alongside war as barriers to peace. The museum is one of ten institutions that came together in 1994 to establish the Association of Japanese Museums for Peace (日本平和博物館会議).

== See also ==
- International Network of Museums for Peace
