= The Peace Museum =

Museum in Chicago, IL

Coordinates: 41°52′57.7″N 87°42′57.9″W

The Peace Museum was a museum located in Chicago, Illinois, that was founded in 1981 by muralist Mark Rogovin and Marjorie Craig Benton, a former US UNICEF representative. Museum staff included Marianne Philbin, Paul Nebenzahl, Ruth Barrett, John Nawn, Kerry Cochrane, Sharon Queen, Sidney Schoenberger, Charles Thomas, Paul Murphy, LuAnne Lewandowski and Martin Moy. Terri Hemmert, Jann Wenner, Paul Caruso and Robin Caruso, Paul Natkin, Jim Hirsch, Aaron Freeman, V. J. McAleer, Harold Washington, Danny Davis, Susan Catania and Harle Montgomery contributed to the Museum's growth.

In 1982, The Peace Museum hosted Give Peace A Chance, a major exhibition about music and peace, featuring John Lennon's guitar inscribed with two drawings of John and Yoko Ono in Lennon's hand. Ono wrote the dedication to the book for the exhibition, published by Chicago Review Press. Also featured in the show were U2, Bob Marley, Holly Near, Joan Baez, Stevie Wonder, Country Joe McDonald, Harry Chapin, Pete Seeger and Graham Nash, among others.

Chicago's Peace Museum opened its doors in 1981 with an exhibition called "The Unforgettable Fire" which featured drawings from survivors of Hiroshima and Nagasaki atomic bombings. The exhibit drew the attention of U2, who held benefits for the museum and named their next album after the exhibition. The Museum also hosted poster exhibitions of the art of John Heartfield, Daumier and Gary Trudeau.

The Peace Museum was one of two peace museums in the US. The other, and the only one still operating, is the Dayton International Peace Museum.

The Peace Museum closed sometime around 2007. In 2011, a suit was brought by the State of Illinois to protect and distribute its collection.
