= Tehran Peace Museum =

Museum in Tehran, Iran

- موزه صلح تهران
- Established: 2007 (renovated 2011)
- Location: Northern gate of Park e Shahr, Tehran, Iran
- Coordinates: 35°41′3.69″N 51°24′52.58″E
- Website: Official website

The Tehran Peace Museum is a member of the International Network of Museums for Peace. The main objective of the museum is to promote a culture of peace through raising awareness about the devastating consequences of war, with a focus on the health and environmental impacts of chemical weapons. Currently housed in a building donated by the municipality of Tehran within the historic City Park, the Tehran Peace Museum is as much an interactive peace center as a museum.

On 29 June 2007, a memorial for the poison gas victims of the Iran–Iraq War (1980–88), along with a Peace Museum, was completed in a park in Tehran, capital of Iran. These facilities were established by the Society for Chemical Weapons Victims Support (an Iranian NGO), the city of Tehran, some other NGOs, and individuals and groups in Hiroshima.

Additionally, the museum houses a documentary studio that provides a workspace wherein the individual stories of victims of warfare can be captured and archived for the historical record. The museum’s peace library includes a collection of literature spanning topics from international law to the implementation of peace to oral histories of veterans and victims of war. 3D Holographic images made from the portraits of Iran–Iraq War's martyrs are exhibited here. They were designed by Hesam Bani-Eghbal and his team at Hesam Animation Studio.

Permanent and rotating peace-related art exhibitions, displaying the work of amateur international and Iranian artists and children's drawings, are also housed in the museum complex. Finally, the Iranian secretariat for the international organization Mayors for Peace is housed in the Tehran Peace Museum.

== Founding the Iranian Peace Museum Movement ==
Its founding began with a conversation between the founders of the Tehran-based Society for Chemical Weapons Victims Support (SCWVS) and a coordinator for the International Peace Museums Network.

It was in Hiroshima where the suffering from atomic arms was able to convert most powerfully into a drive for peace manifested via a peace museum. This ability to use the intense suffering of war to highlight the need for peace made the Tehran Peace Museum’s founders realize Iran's parallel suffering from chemical arms and the need for a parallel drive for peace.

== Focus on survivor involvement ==
While visiting Hiroshima Peace Memorial Museum, the founders of the Tehran Peace Museum realized the necessity of involving the victims of war in the creation of the museum.

== Opening ceremony of the new building ==
On 29 June 2011, concurrent with the anniversary of the gas attack on the city of Sardasht in 1987 and the Day of Campaign against Chemical Weapons, the new building of the Tehran Peace Museum was officially opened for public. During the ceremony, a number of guests from different countries, including the director of Hiroshima peace museum, a delegation representing the survivors of Hiroshima atomic bombing, survivors of chemical weapons attack from Halabja, Northern Iraq, as well many Iranian activists and war veterans attended.

== Some activities ==
An observance of the International Day of Remembrance for all victims of chemical warfare was held in the Tehran Peace Museum on Sunday, 29 April 2012.

Other parts of the program included a statement by a representative of the Iranian victims of chemical warfare, music performance, and the planting of olive trees.

== Information for visitors ==
Address: Northern gate of the City Park (Park-e Shahr), Tehran, Iran.
