= WXRT =

Alternative rock radio station in Chicago

- Chicago, Illinois; United States
- Broadcast area: Chicago metropolitan area
- Frequency: 93.1 MHz (HD Radio)
- Branding: 93XRT

Programming
- Language: English
- Format: Adult album alternative (AAA)

Ownership
- Owner: Audacy, Inc.; (Audacy License, LLC)
- Sister stations: WBBM; WBBM-FM; WCFS-FM; WSCR; WSCR-FM; WUSN

History
- First air date: March 15, 1960
- Former call signs: WSBC-FM (1960–1963); WXRT (1963–2000); WXRT-FM (2000–2011)
- Call sign meaning: No meaning

Technical information
- Licensing authority: FCC
- Facility ID: 16853
- Class: B
- ERP: 6,700 watts (analog); 267 watts (digital)
- HAAT: 399 meters (1,309 ft)
- Transmitter coordinates: 41.899°N 87.623°W

Links
- Public license information: Public file; LMS
- Webcast: Listen live (via Audacy); Listen live (via iHeartRadio)
- Website: www.audacy.com/wxrt

WXRT (93.1 FM), also known as XRT and 93-XRT, is an adult album alternative radio station in Chicago, Illinois. The station is owned by Audacy, Inc.

The station broadcasts from a transmitter atop John Hancock Center and its studios are located at Two Prudential Plaza near Chicago's Millennium Park. WXRT broadcasts in the HD Radio format.

== Programming ==
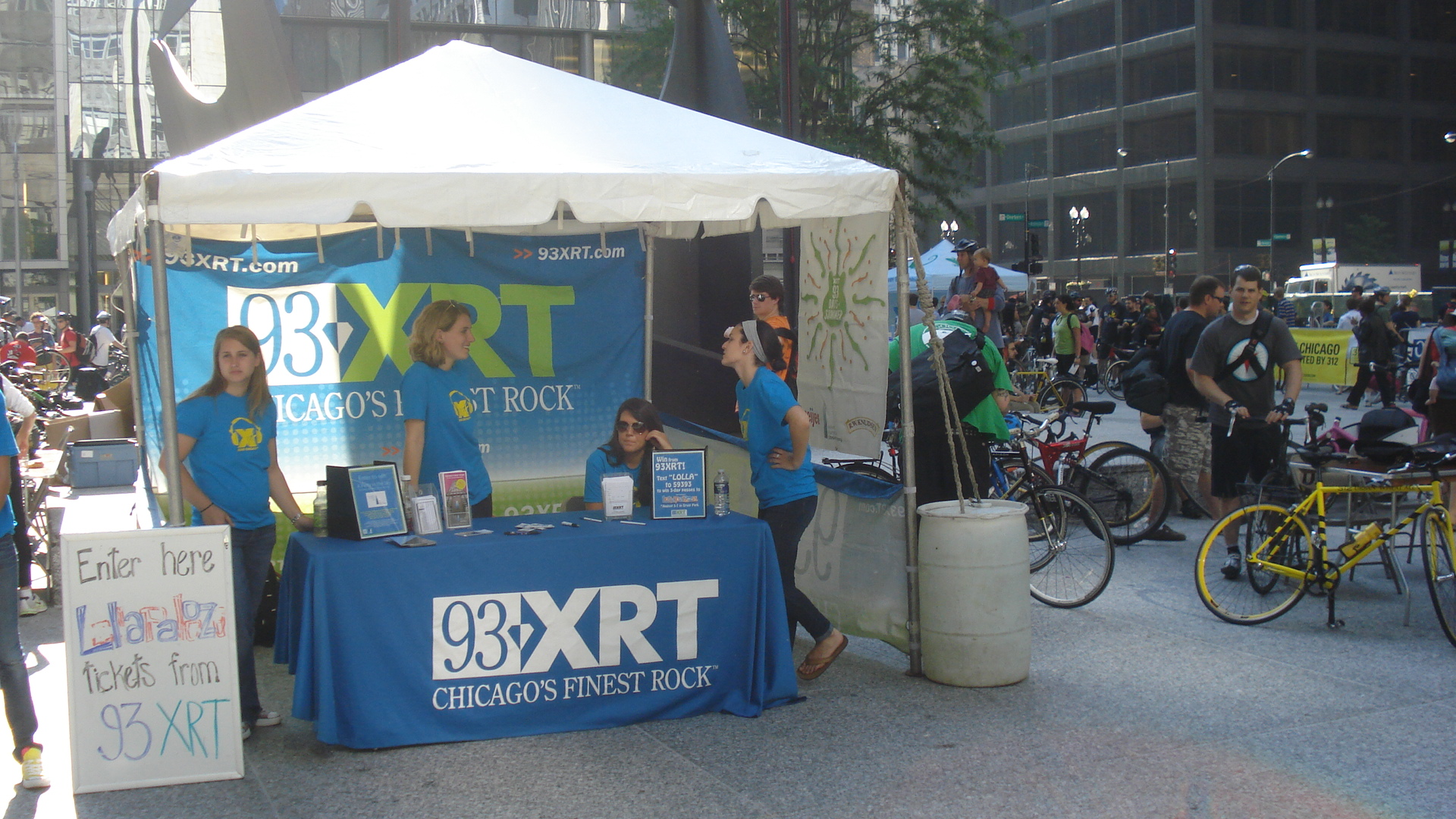
WXRT tent at an event in Daley Plaza

WXRT plays a very broad range of music in a format known as AAA/Triple-A (Adult album alternative). With a playlist of more than 5,000 songs from wide-ranging genres including blues, reggae, folk-rock, pop, and rock and roll, WXRT is considered a pioneer in the format. WXRT is well known for several locally produced, original programs such as Saturday Morning Flashback hosted by Frank E. Lee, Johnny Mars, and Annalisa on a rotating basis, Breakfast with the Beatles hosted by Terri Hemmert, and the Lin's Bin essay series by longtime morning host Lin Brehmer, which ran from 2002 until 2022, shortly before Brehmer's death.

Local music show "Local Anesthetic", hosted by Richard Milne, aired its final show on December 24, 2017. The final "Jazz Transfusion" hosted by Barry Winograd aired February 4, 2018, marking the end of more than four decades of the program. WXRT introduced several popular specialty programs in recent years. 'All Vinyl Saturday' began in 2016 to celebrate Record Store Day by playing individual songs and entire album sides non-stop for 12 hours. The albums selected to be played are from the personal record collections of DJs Marty Lennartz, Frank E. Lee, Annalisa, Johnny Mars, Andy Chanley, Emma Mac, and Don Davis. Due to "All Vinyl Saturdays" popularity, the feature is presented 3 to 4 times a year.

== History ==
=== WFJL-FM ===
WFJL – (standing for Frank J. Lewis) went on the air on May 22, 1949. WFJL operated as a non-commercial station by Lewis College of Science and Technology (previous name of Lewis College, now Lewis University). The station's license was cancelled in 1956. WFJL, under the leadership of Roman Catholic Auxiliary Bishop Most Rev. Bernard J. Sheil, D.D., of the Archdiocese of Chicago and general manager Jerry Keefe, radio format consisted of religious, educational, news, talk, and CYO Boxing. WFJL's facilities were located at the Lincoln Tower Building, 75 East Wacker Drive in Chicago, 600 feet (180 m) above ground and had an effective radiated power of 29,000 watts.

=== WSBC-FM ===
The station began broadcasting March 15, 1960, holding the call sign WSBC-FM. The station's studios and transmitter were located at the West Town State Bank Building at 2400 W. Madison in Chicago, and it had an ERP of 27,500 watts. WSBC-FM featured a variety of musical programming, including classical, jazz, folk, and popular music shows, and simulcast some of the ethnic programming of its sister station 1240 WSBC, when the shared-time station was on the air. The station was owned by Louie Lee. In 1962, its ERP was increased to 55,000 watts.

=== WXRT ===
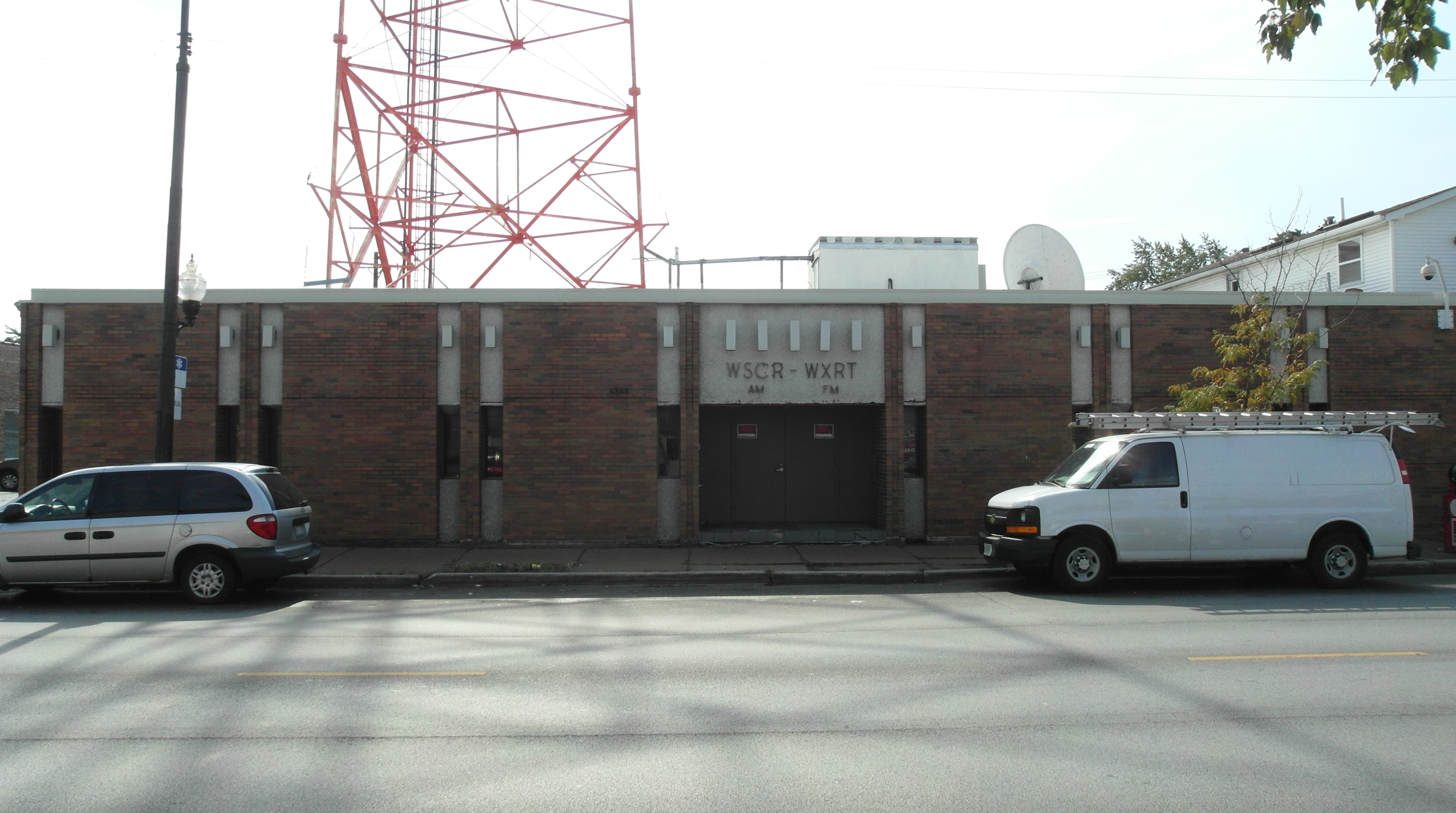
Former studio and transmitter site at 4949 W. Belmont

In 1963, the station's call sign was changed to WXRT. The station increasingly aired ethnic programming. In 1971, WXRT's studios and transmitter were moved to 4949 West Belmont Ave., where it operated with an ERP of 50,000 watts at a HAAT of 500 feet. In 1981, the station's transmitter was moved to the John Hancock Center.

The format as it exists today began in August 1972 as a nighttime-only freeform rock experiment, while a variety of ethnic programming continued to air during the daytime hours. The part-time progressive rock format was started by Don Bridges, who soon brought in Mitch Michaels and a bit later John Platt, Seth Mason, and Bob Schulman. Norm Winer served as program director from 1979 through 2016. Greg Solk was named program director in 2017. Laura Duncan joined as Program Director in 2021.

The format's hours were gradually expanded, and on April 26, 1976, it began airing 24 hours a day. The station was branded "Chicago's Fine Rock Station" and later "Chicago's Finest Rock". In the 1980s, the station heavily played music from the new wave, synthpop, and alternative rock groups of that era. By the 1990s, the station's format was considered adult album alternative. The station's offices and studios were located at 4949 West Belmont Ave. on the northwest side of Chicago until 2008, when it was relocated to the NBC Tower in downtown Chicago. On March 16, 2010, it was again relocated to the Prudential Plaza.

In 1995, Danny Lee, son of the station's original owner Louie Lee, sold the station to Westinghouse for $44 million. Shortly thereafter, Westinghouse would acquire CBS and Infinity Radio, with the company changing its name to CBS Corp. The Infinity name was retained for its radio division. CBS and Viacom would merge in 2000. In December 2005, Infinity Radio officially became CBS Radio in anticipation of the CBS/Viacom split up.

On February 2, 2017, CBS Radio announced it would merge with Entercom. The merger was approved on November 9, 2017, and was consummated on November 17.

In 2023, longtime DJ Lin Brehmer died at age 68. The station aired a tribute to him.

In April 2026, WXRT became the most listened to station in Chicago for the first time, matching its highest ratings in history.

==== April Fools' jokes ====
WXRT has performed numerous April Fools' Day jokes, dating back to the 1970s. In 1982, the station promoted "Mayor Jane Byrne April Fool Fest" on Navy Pier, promising live performances by multiple artists, some of whom were dead. Hundreds of people showed up to the then-derelict and padlocked Navy Pier, believing that the festival was real.

In 1998, WXRT stated that it was now a subsidiary of Playboy Enterprises. The station said it was now "True Adult Radio", and that its call sign was changed to WXXXRT.
