= Fukuromachi Elementary School Peace Museum =

Museum in Hiroshima, Japan

Coordinates: 34.391760°N 132.458706°E

- 袋町小学校平和資料館
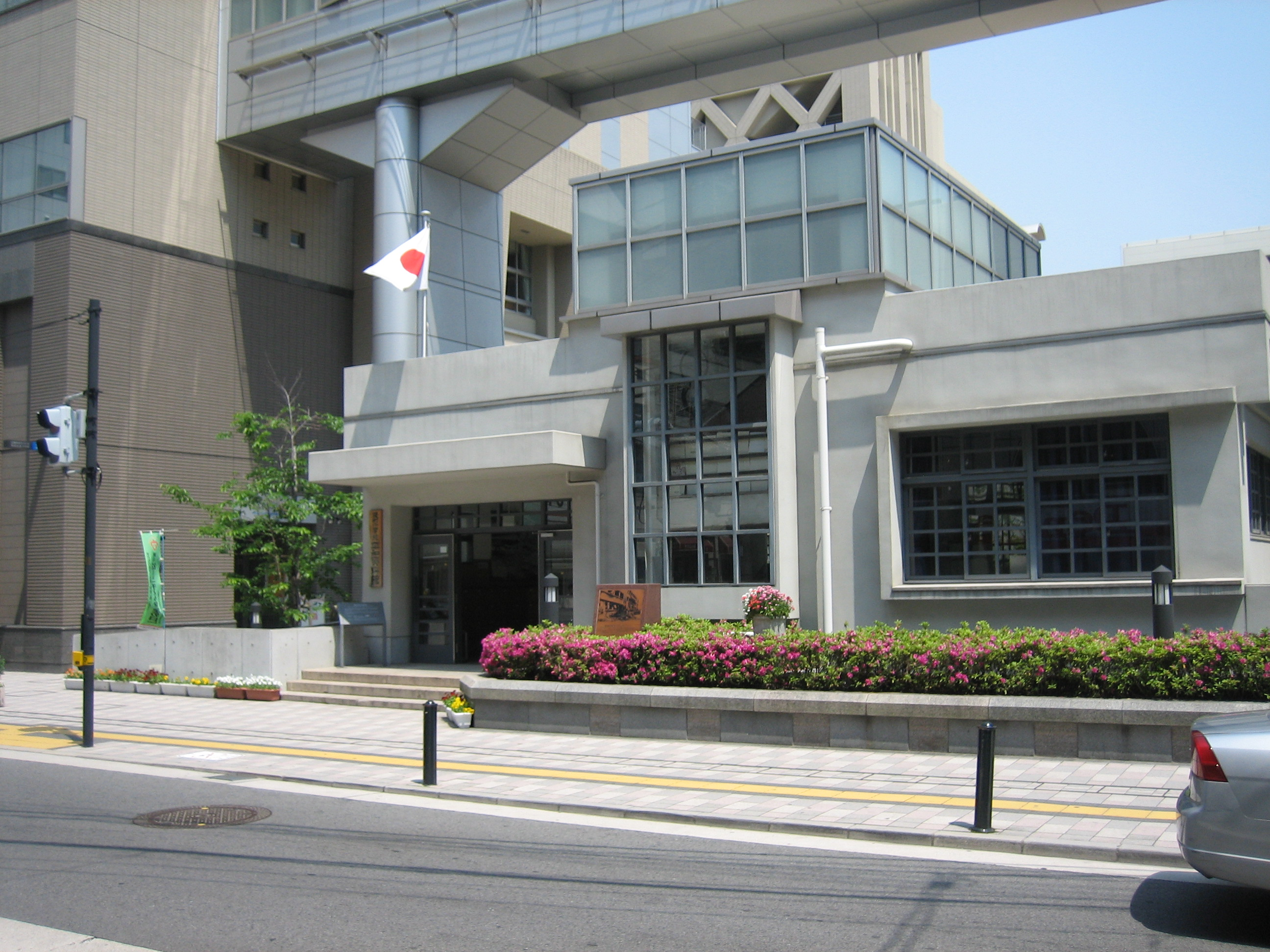
- Established: February 2, 1873, built in December 1937, opened as a museum in April 2002
- Location: 6-36, Fukuromachi, Naka-ku, Hiroshima
- Website: www.fukuromachi-e.edu.city.hiroshima.jp/siryoukan.htm

The Fukuromachi Elementary School Peace Museum (袋町小学校平和資料館, Fukuromachi Shogakkou Heiwa Shiryokan) is a peace museum in Fukuromachi, Naka-ku, Hiroshima, Japan. The school was one of the closest schools to ground zero when the atomic bomb fell on August 6, 1945. They lost about 160 students and teachers and the building was heavily damaged. After a few days, the school became a first aid station, and its black burned wall became a message board to find missing people. The Peace Museum is the section of the school building with the basement of the former Municipal Fukuromachi Elementary School in Hiroshima. The school is keeping it as a relic of the atomic explosion, to foster peace, and to send their information to the world.

== History ==
- Opened as a school in the Kaizen-ji, a temple of Pure Land Buddhism, on February 2, 1873.
- Moved to Fukuromachi, the current place and was renamed "Sakuragawa School" in September 1876.
- Renamed "Onchi Elementary School" in October 1884.
- Renamed "Fukuromachi Jinjyo Elementary School" in August 1890.
- Moved to Harimayamachi and renamed "Harimayamachi Jinjyo Elementary School" in March 1893.
- Moved back to Fukuromachi in May 1910.
- Renamed "Fukuromachi Jinjyo Elementary School" in April 1911.
- The main lecture hall was built in February 1927.
- The reinforced concrete school building was built in January 1937.
- About 160 students and teachers were killed by the atomic bomb on August 6, 1945.
- School reopened for 37 students in May 1946.
- Renamed "Municipal Fukuromachi Elementary School in Hiroshima", current name, in April 1947.
- New building and lecture hall was built in November 1952.
- Another new building was built in June 1957.
- Moved to temporary schoolhouse in December 1999.
- New school buildings were built in April 2002.
- Part of the building, built in 1937, was opened as the Peace Museum in April 2002.

== Museum ==
=== Exhibitions ===
- Photographs
- Damaged objects

=== Education programs ===
- NHK TV documentary program will be shown
  - Please Tell Me - Hiroshima, The Recalling Messages of the Atomic Bomb -
    - NHK Special: "Please Yuko, Tell me where you are, from your mom"
    - NHK Special: "The Day of the Atomic Bomb"

== See also ==
- Atomic bombings of Hiroshima and Nagasaki
- Honkawa Elementary School Peace Museum
