= The International Peace Museum =

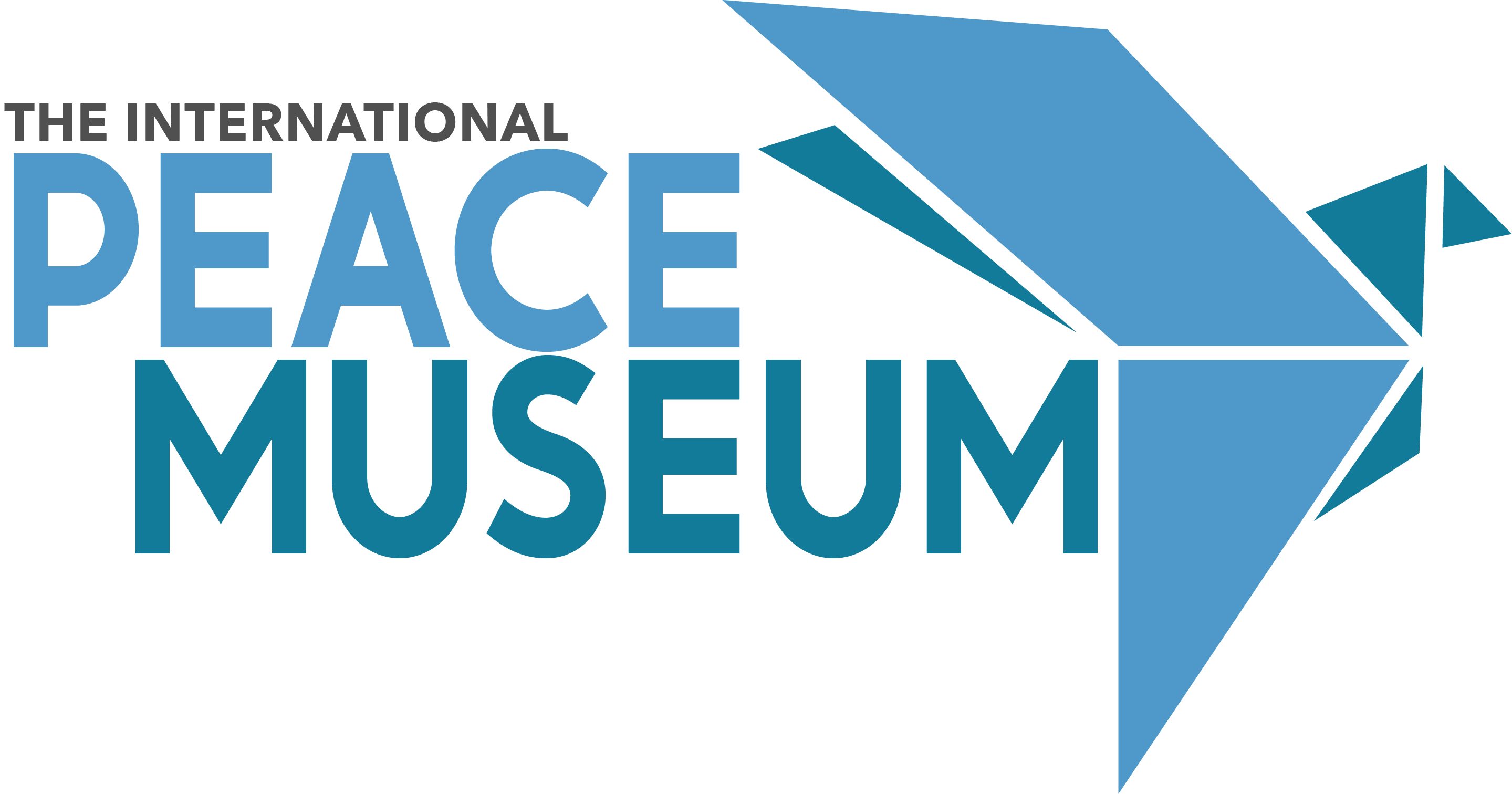

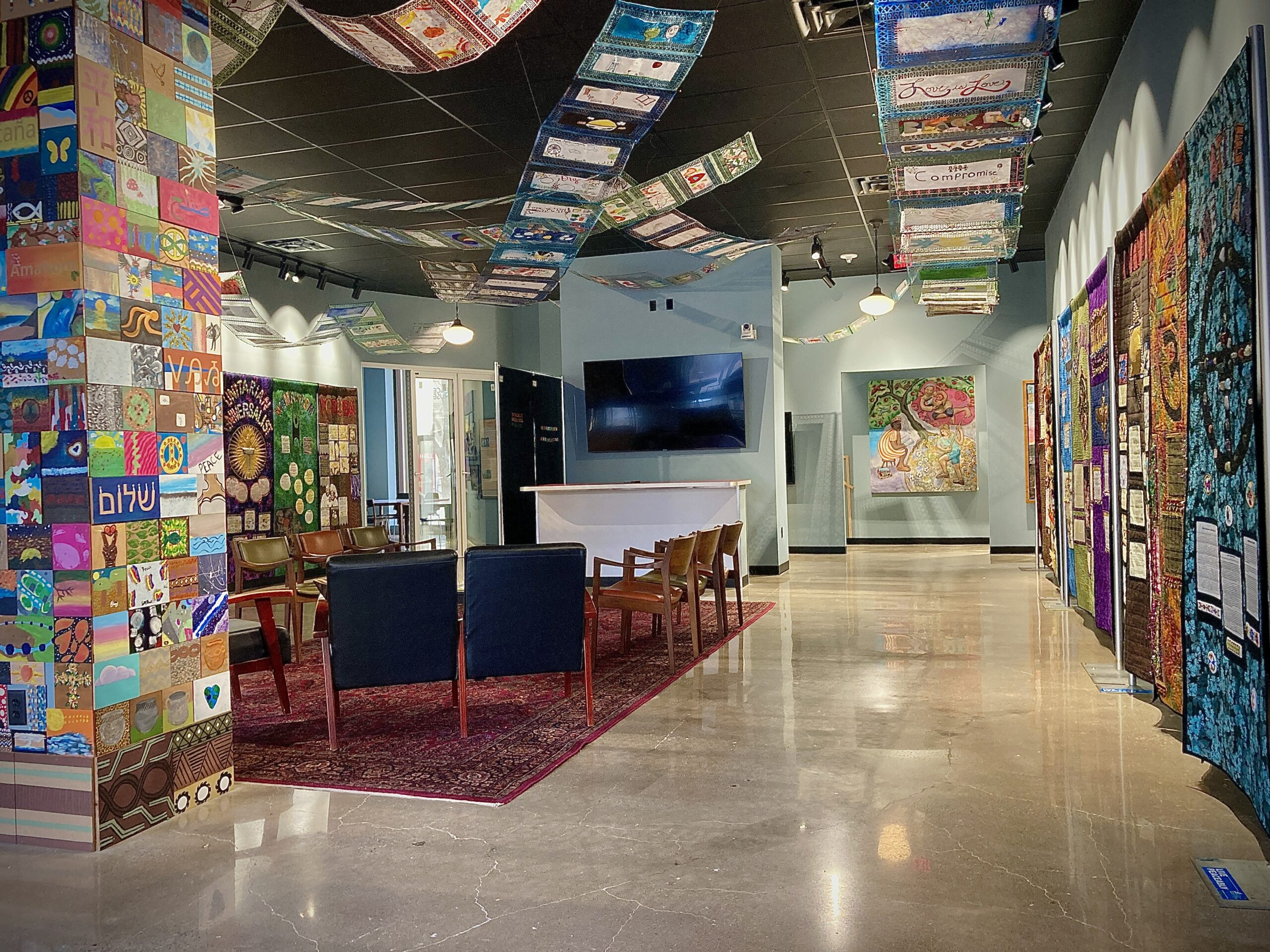
- Interior view of the main exhibit space of the International Peace Museum
- Former name: Dayton International Peace Museum
- Established: May 27, 2003; 23 years ago
- Location: 10 N. Ludlow Street; Dayton, OH, 45402, USA
- Coordinates: 39.7597864°N 84.1932922°W
- Type: Peace museum
- Founders: Chris and Ralph Dull
- Executive director: Alice Young-Basora (since 2024)
- Website: peace.museum

The International Peace Museum (formerly the Dayton International Peace Museum) is a non-profit, peace museum located on historic Courthouse Square in downtown Dayton, Ohio, United States. The museum's mission is to promote, through education and collaboration, a more equitable, civil, and peaceful world. Its programs and exhibits are non-partisan, secular, and feature themes of conflict resolution, equity, social justice, tolerance, and protecting our natural world. It commemorates the 1995 Dayton Agreement that ended the war in Bosnia. It is "America's only brick-and-mortar peace museum."

In addition to functioning as a traditional museum, the Peace Museum serves as an activities center for those who seek a community of peace. The Museum features permanent, temporary, and traveling exhibits that highlight the rich history of, and potential for, nonviolent solutions to conflict and sustainability in the natural world. The Museum hosts two to three guest exhibits annually.

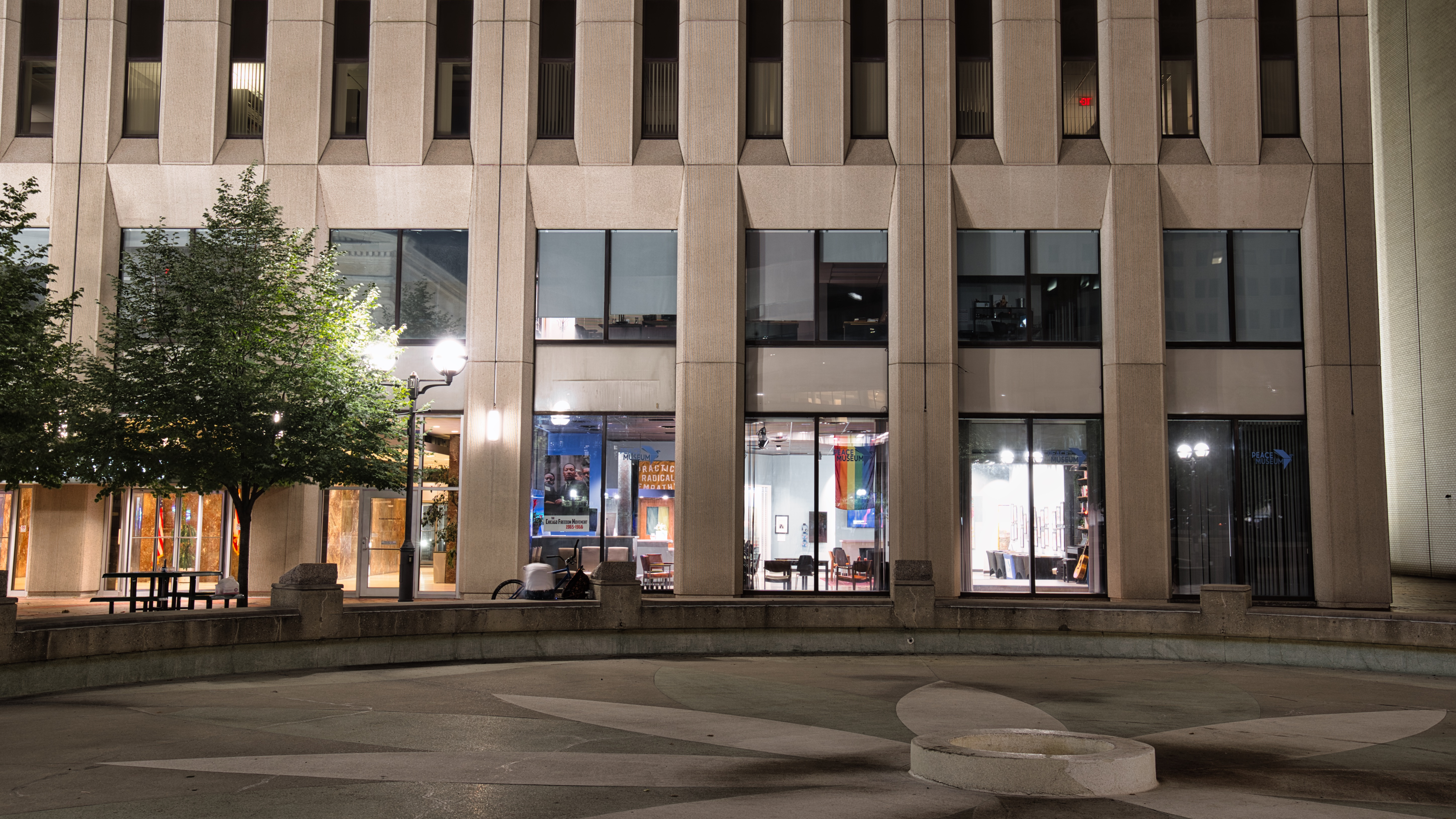
Exterior view of the International Peace Museum from Courthouse Square

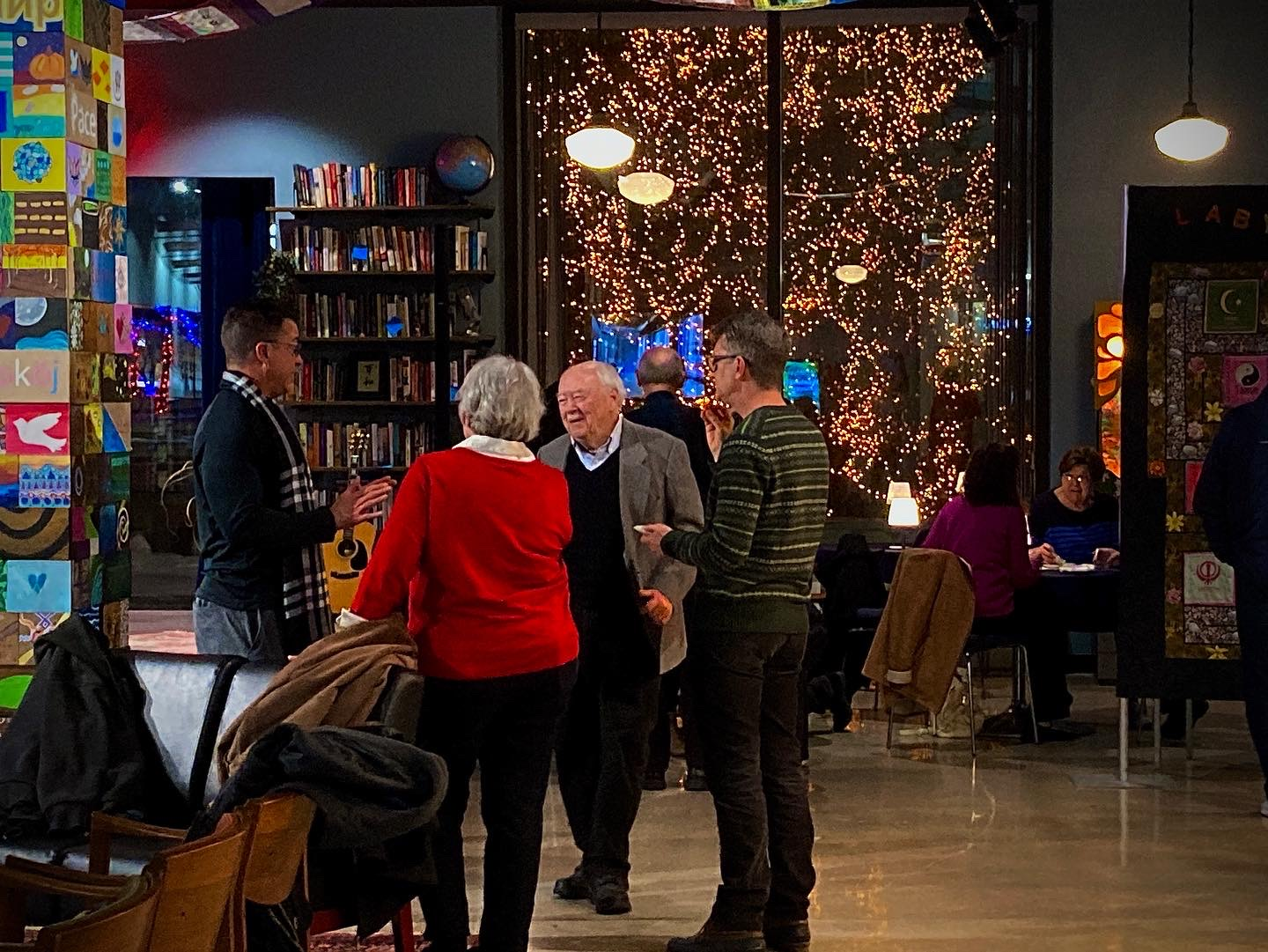
Event at International Peace Museum

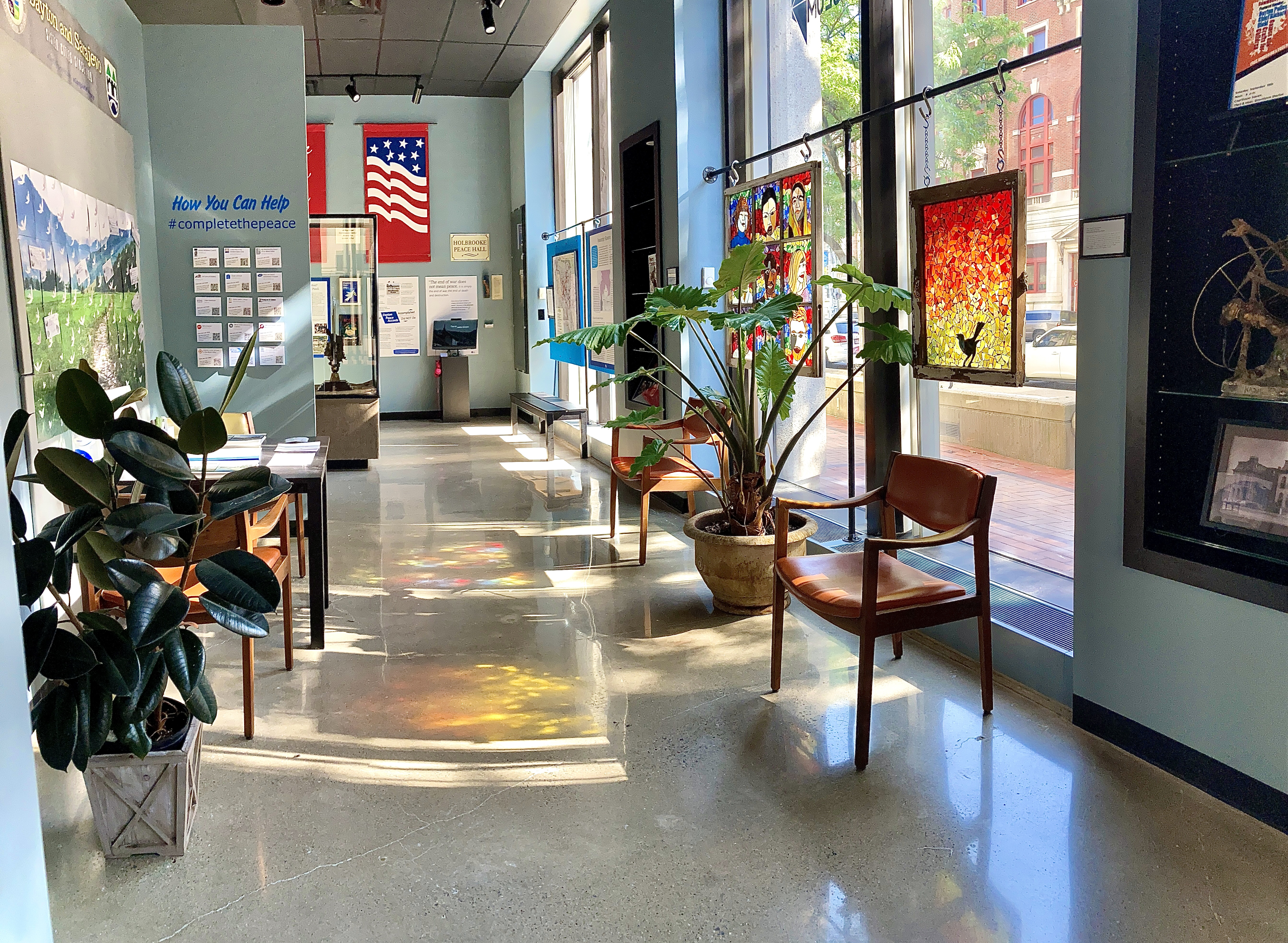
International Peace Museum Exhibit Space

Located in the Courthouse Plaza Building on Dayton's Courthouse Square, the Peace Museum includes a library, a podcasting studio, the Jack Meagher Gallery, traveling and permanent collections, a stage, and small gift shop. The Museum holds events such as book discussions and live music, storytelling, and guest speakers.

The museum is open from 10 A.M to 5 P.M Friday and Saturday for visitors and Tuesday -Thursday for scheduled school visits and group tours. The admission is $5, and it is free for members.

== History ==
The Dayton International Peace Museum was founded in 2004 by farmers Ralph and Christine Dull, along with J. Frederick Arment, Lisa Wolters, and Steve Fryburg. The world's first peace museum opened in 1902 in Lucene, Switzerland. The museum is run by Executive Director Kevin Kelly. It was the second peace museum to be created in the United States; the first was The Peace Museum in Chicago, Illinois, which closed in 2006. It is the only comprehensive peace museum in the Western Hemisphere still with a physical location. Peace Museum Colorado opened in 2018, focusing on Peace Heroes.

In 2005, the museum moved into Dayton's historic Isaac Pollack House. In 2014, the 1877 structure was refitted with modern technology. The new equipment allowed the Peace Museum to produce multimedia, interactive exhibits, and to broadcast programs and virtual exhibits to multiple rooms.

Ralph and Christine Dull were long-time peace activists and members of the Fellowship of Reconciliation, receiving numerous awards for books published and their work around the local area. Ralph received the 2009 Pioneer of Ohio Award from Green Energy Ohio and the National EPA Award for Environmental Stewardship in 2010.

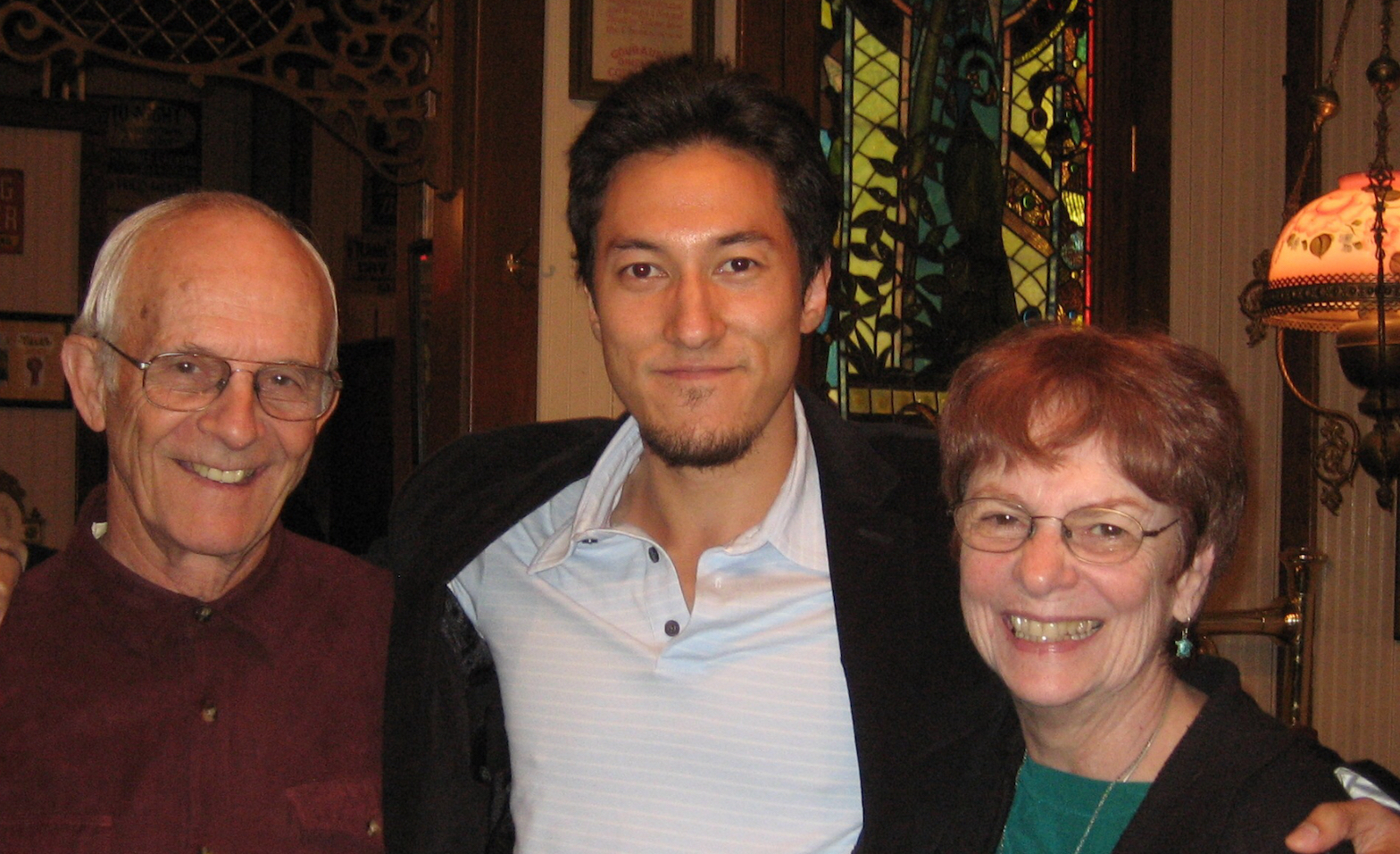
Museum founders, Chris and Ralph Dull, with Paul K. Chappell, founder of The Peace Literacy Institute.

Since their departure, the museum has maintained a focus on local change, meeting with local leaders and encouraging broader interpretations of peace within the community. In 2017, the museum participated in the local "Building Peace Through the Arts" initiative alongside the University of Dayton, Dayton Philharmonic, and other local arts institutions. More recently, in response to the 2019 Dayton shooting and rising gun violence in the U.S., the museum partnered with the Facing Project to publish a collection of 16 stories detailing the experience of gun-violence survivors. The book Facing Gun Violence: It’s Always Close to Home for Someone was released on August 1, 2020.

In September 2021 the museum temporarily closed for visitors due to the pandemic. During that time, it hosted regular virtual yoga classes, discussions, and educational presentations. It opened again in May 2022 in a new facility on Courthouse Square. Its first new exhibit since the pandemic was a photography series by Bernard Kleina on Martin Luther King Jr.'s Chicago Freedom Movement.

In September 2024, Kevin Kelly stepped down as Executive Director of the International Peace Museum, and Alice Young-Basora, formerly the Director of Education, assumed the role becoming the first female Executive Director of the International Peace Museum.

== Current initiatives ==
The museum is an active member of the Peace in Our Cities global initiative, the Austrian Service Abroad program, the Association of Children's Museums, and are on the advisory board of the International Network of Museums of Peace based in Kyoto. The Museum partners with the International Cities of Peace, University of Dayton Human Rights Center, ThinkTV, the Kyiv Peace Museum, and the Srebenica Genocide Memorial in Bosnia and Herzegovina, among others.

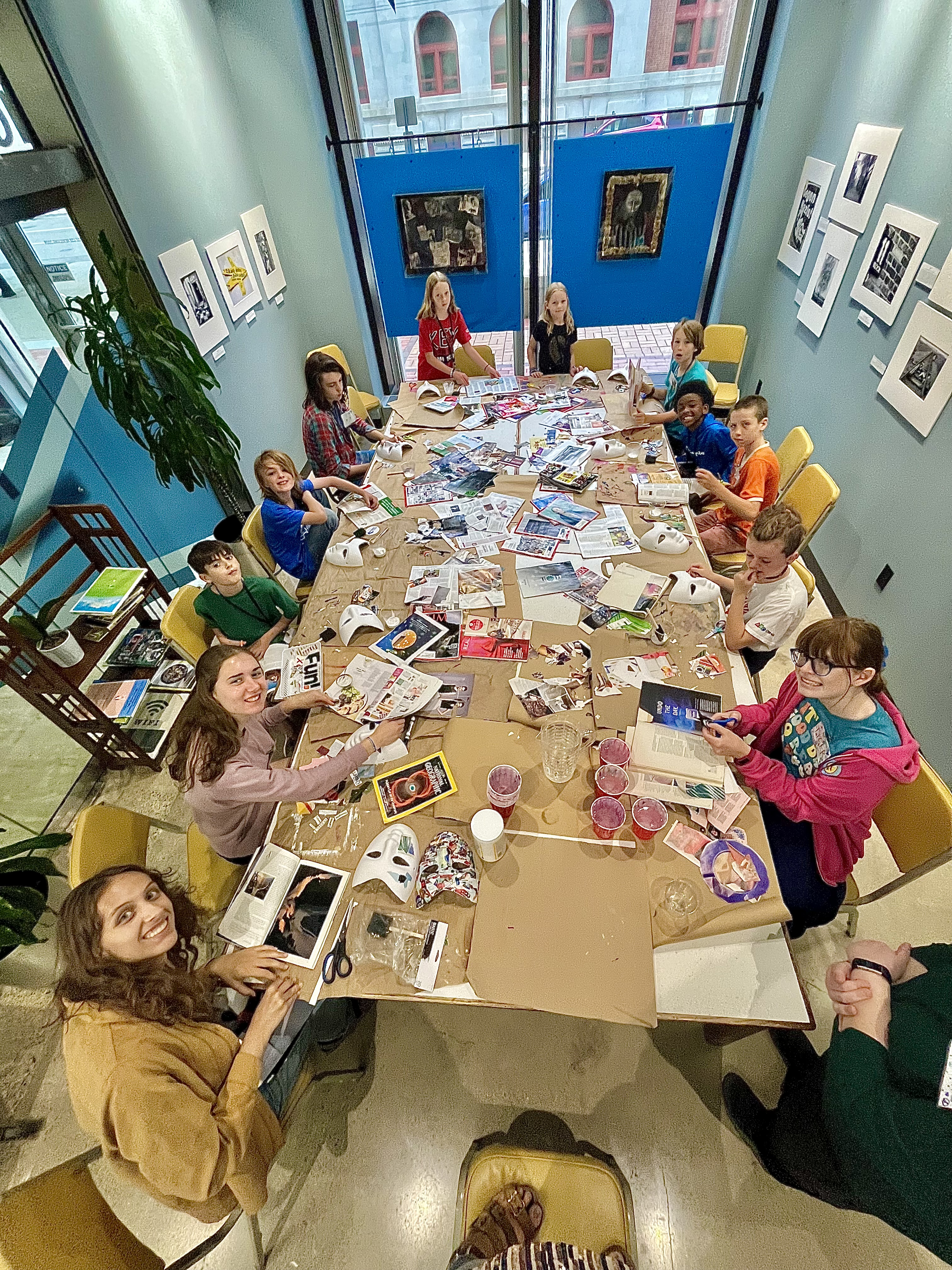
Educational Program Activity

The museum hosts a number of different permanent and temporary exhibits, notably featuring an extensive exhibit on the Dayton Peace Accords, complete with interactive panels and touchscreens. Their exhibit on the peace accords is the most extensive of its kind and was digitized for the 25th anniversary in 2020. It is currently available on the museum's website. The museum features the "positive work people are doing all over the world to promote peace", including Dayton Peace Heroes.

Outside of their exhibitions, the museum's standing programs include several discussion based events, with "Building Peace" talks given on a variety of topics by guest speakers and a series of community discussions on Martin Luther King Jr.'s writings called "MLK Dialogues." Outside of the talks, they also host an annual summer camp for children, and periodic programs on Kingian Nonviolence, mediation, peace literacy education, and compassionate education. The Dayton Peace Trail honors the local "spaces of peace and justice."

The museum has also held larger events for the community, partnering with former NFL player and Dayton native Chris Borland in the wake of the 2019 Dayton shooting for the inaugural Dayton Peace Festival. Held over three days, the event combined music and free yoga sessions with serious discussions on the gun violence and the community.

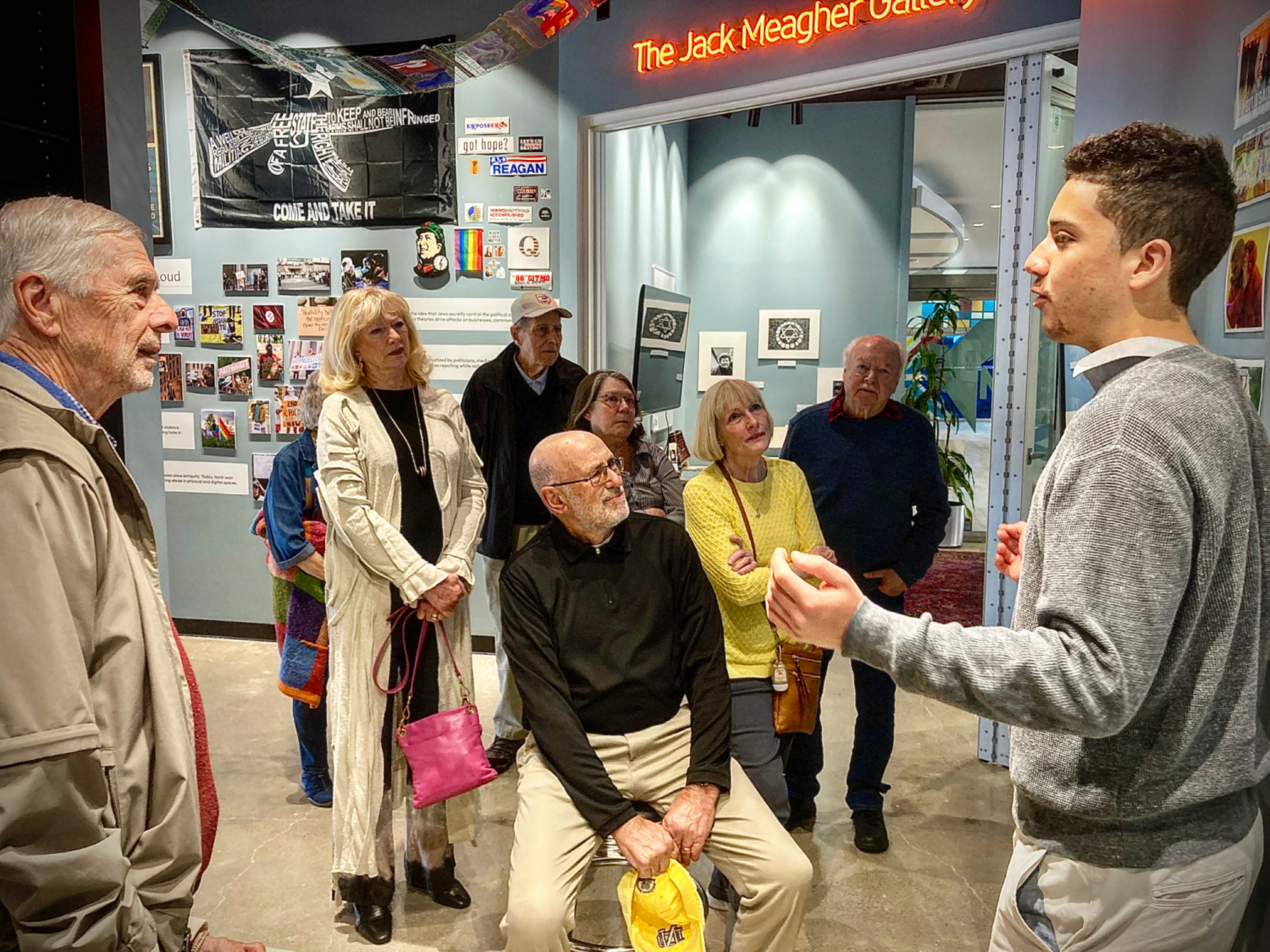
Tour group visiting the museum

The Museum's former Executive Director, Kevin Kelly, has also been active within local media, writing guest opinion columns in the Columbus Dispatch and Dayton Daily News on racial and social justice. He has most recently written on the legacies of civil rights icons Martin Luther King Jr. and John Lewis in the contexts of the 2021 storming of the United States Capitol, political tension, and the COVID-19 pandemic.

The Museum is also the official repository of each fiction and nonfiction book submitted annually to the Dayton Literary Peace Prize. Recent winners of the Richard Holbrooke Award include John Irving, Alice Hoffman, Elie Wiesel, Chanel Miller, and Hala Alyan.

== See also ==
- The International Peace Museum
- Peace museum
- List of peace activists
- The Peace Museum, Chicago
