= Osaka International Peace Center =

World War II history museum in Japan

Coordinates: 34°40′54″N 135°31′48″E

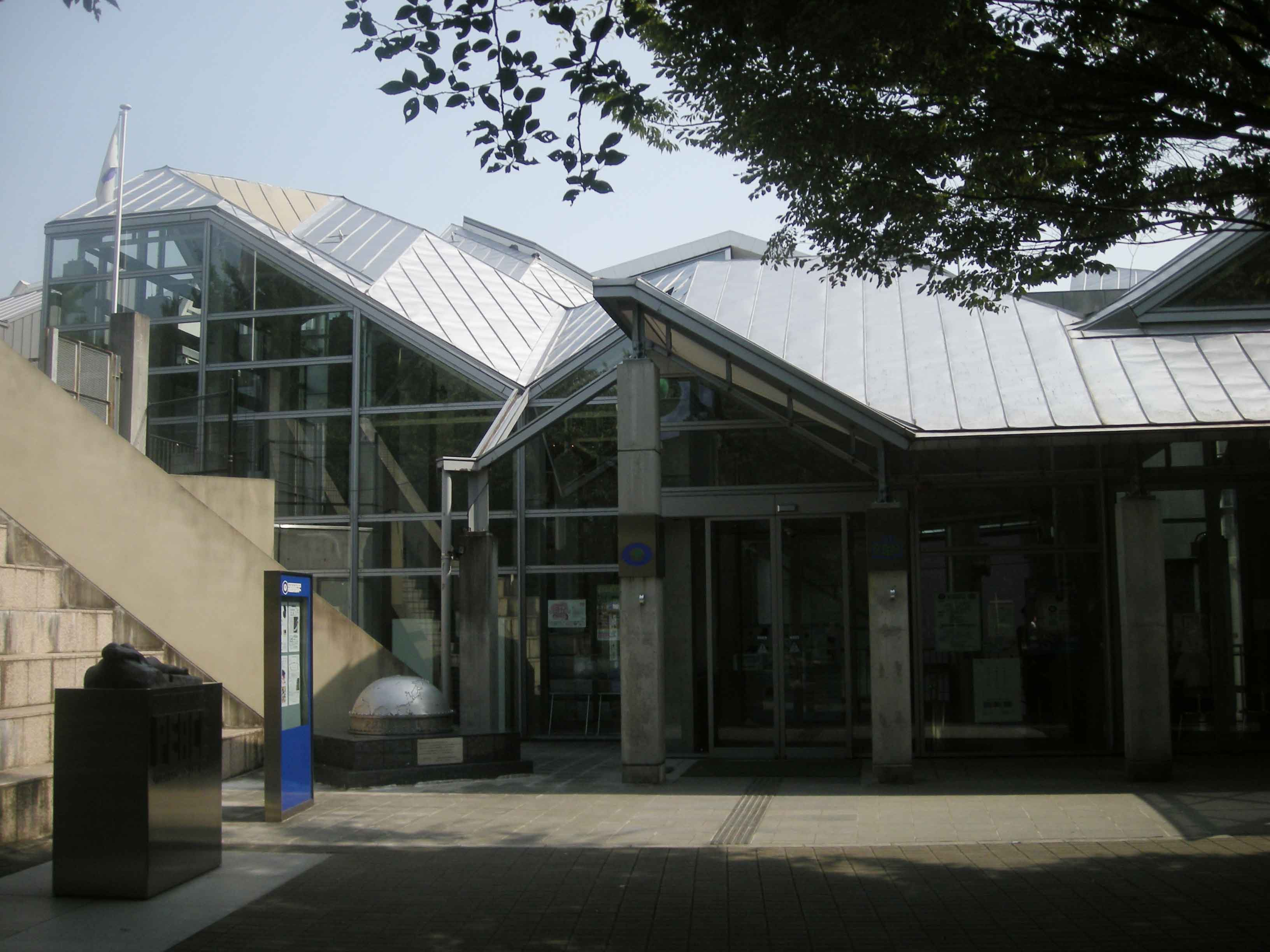
Peace Osaka

The Osaka International Peace Center (大阪国際平和センター, Ōsaka-kokusai-heiwa-sentā), also known as Peace Osaka (ピースおおさか, Pīsu-Ōsaka), is a peace museum established in August 1991 based in the city of Osaka, Japan. It focuses on the destruction of the city during World War II and the broader themes of the tragedy of war and the importance of peace. It is funded by Osaka city and Osaka Prefecture.

In 2015, after pressures by members of the Japan Innovation Party, exhibits were changed; the section on U.S. air raids in Osaka Prefecture between December 1944 and August 1945 was expanded and items related to Japan's actions in Asia were removed. The spirit of the museum was radically altered and transformed: it became a conservative museum.

== Founding and early history ==
The museum was established in 1991 and was rare in Japan for showing the atrocities committed by Japan as well as the tragedies suffered by Japanese people. In 2000 it hosted a symposium by the Osaka-based historical revisionist group "Society to Correct the Biased Display of War-Related Materials" with Shūdō Higashinakano of Asia University as the keynote speaker. A Chinese government spokesperson stated that hosting the event would hurt the Osaka bid for the 2008 Summer Olympics. Osaka later became the first city to be eliminated from the bidding process, with the games later being awarded to Beijing.

== Political pressure to censor ==
Since opening, the museums exhibits were described as "masochistic" by conservative groups. In September 2013 the museum unveiled a plan to put more emphasis on the Bombing of Osaka during World War II. There was a possibility that exhibits dealing with Japanese war crimes may be reduced. When it became clear that the plans were to "drastically" reduce the material on Japan's aggression, the Japan Times printed an editorial calling on the museum to reconsider and stated that "The plan by the center — which is dedicated to studies of the war and efforts to foster peace — contradicts its purported independence."

== Exhibits before 2015 ==
Exhibition Room A, on the second floor of the Osaka International Peace Center, covered the bombing of Osaka and other factors of Japanese domestic life during the last four years of the Pacific War, mentioning neighborhood associations, school mobilization, nationalistic textbooks, and civil defense measures.

Exhibition Room B, on the first floor, covered the Greater East Asia Co-Prosperity Sphere and was critical of the Imperial Japanese Army's actions in East Asia. One panel was entitled "Invading the Asian Continent," and was accompanied by displays of the Imperial Japanese Army's involvement in the Second Sino-Japanese War. There is also a section on the annexation of Korea, starting from its preparation in 1909, and Korea under Japanese rule, ending with a note that "Japan has still many unsolved problems" regarding the human rights of the 680,000 resident Koreans in Japan today.

Exhibition Room C, on the third floor, advocated the end of "disputes and wars over ethnic, religious, or ideological differences." These exhibits focus on the threat of nuclear weapons, but also argue that starvation, poverty, and degradation of the global environment are threats to world peace. To emphasize these threats to peace, the museum includes a replica of the Doomsday Clock.

== Exhibits after changes in 2015 ==
After renovations in 2015, the exhibit areas became:

- Zone A (2nd floor): The appearance of Osaka in 1945 and now
- Zone B (2nd floor): Explains why Japan waged war with the US
- Zone C (2nd floor): Life in Osaka during the war
- Zone D (1st floor): Osaka reduced to ashes
- Zone E (3rd floor): Osaka after the war
- Zone F (3rd floor): What all of us can do to maintain peace

== Information ==
- Address: 2-1 Osakajo, Chūō-ku
- Hours: 9:30 am – 5:00 pm (entrance until 4:30 pm)
- Holidays: Mondays, days following national holidays, last day of every month, New Year period.
