= Lin Brehmer =

American radio host (1954–2023)

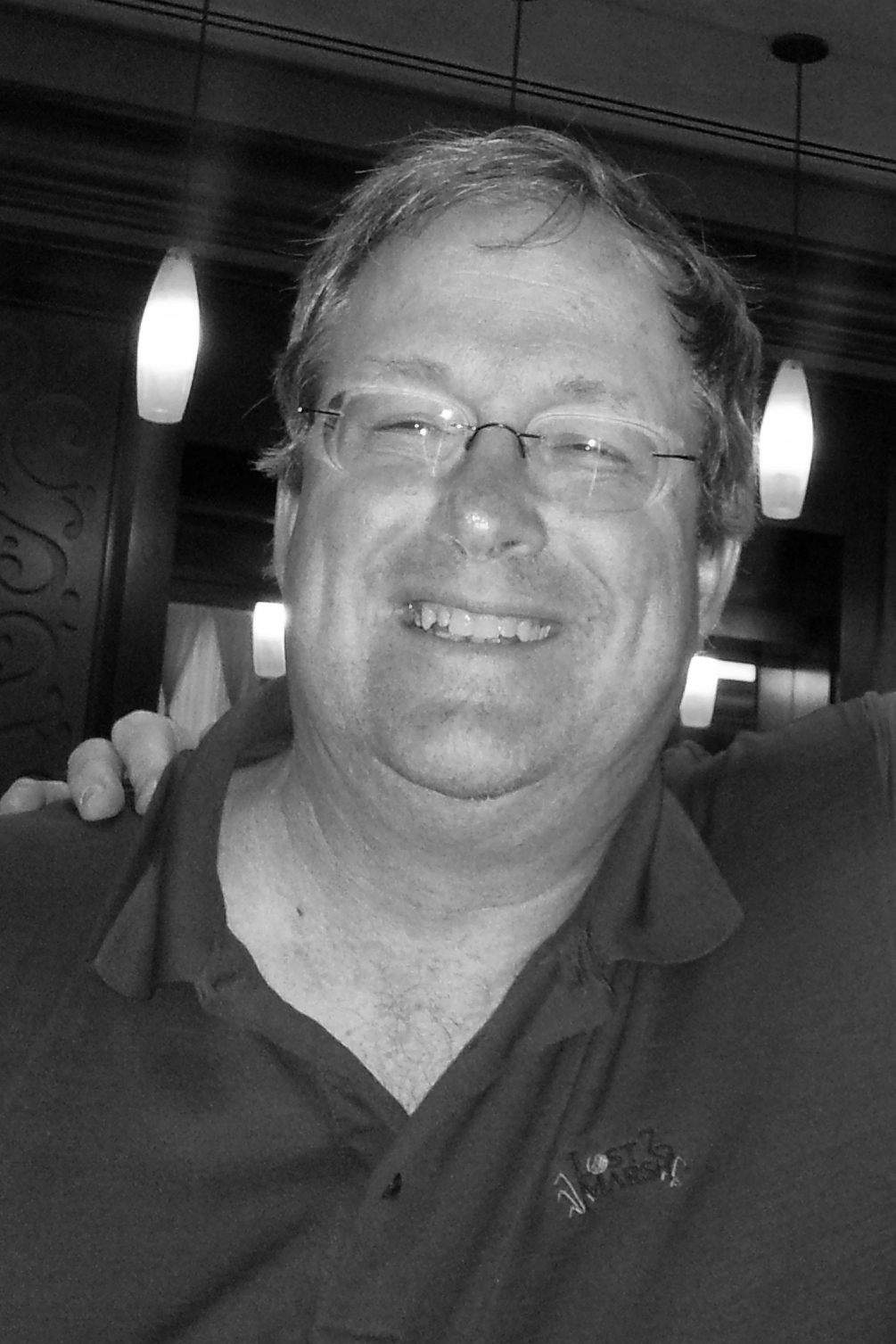
- Brehmer in 2012
- Born: August 19, 1954; Queens, New York City, U.S.
- Died: January 22, 2023 (aged 68); Chicago, Illinois, U.S.
- Education: Colgate University
- Years active: 1977–2022
- Spouse: Sara Farr
- Presenting career
- Stations: WXRT, Chicago
- Country: United States

Lin Brehmer (August 19, 1954 – January 22, 2023) was an American disc jockey and radio personality at WXRT in Chicago. Brehmer hosted mornings on WXRT from 1991 to 2020, and middays from early 2020 until taking a leave of absence to undergo chemotherapy in 2022.

== Early life and education ==
Brehmer graduated from Colgate University in 1976, where he got his start in radio while filling in at the university's student-run WRCU-FM radio station during a summer semester.

== Early career ==
Brehmer began working professionally in radio in January 1977. His first disc jockey job was in Albany, New York at WQBK-FM, where he earned the nickname, "The Reverend of Rock and Roll." After seven years at WQBK, Brehmer left the position and moved to Chicago to work for WXRT as music director beginning in October 1984.

== WXRT ==
During his first six years at WXRT, Brehmer was named "Music Director of the Year" by FMQB three times. In 1989, Hard Report's readers voted Brehmer as "Music Director of the Decade." In October 1990, Brehmer left WXRT and moved to Minnesota for a job as program director of KTCZ-FM. After completing a one-year contract at KTCZ-FM, Brehmer returned to Chicago's WXRT to serve as the morning D.J., replacing Terri Hemmert.

For 30 years, Brehmer (an avid Chicago Cubs fan) hosted an annual remote broadcast for Cubs home opening day.

External videos
- Remarks by U.S. Rep. Mike Quigley (D-IL) on the impact of WXRT and Lin Brehmer, January 24, 2012

In 2009, WXRT sent a mass email using Brehmer's name to subscribers, encouraging political action to lobby Congress regarding music royalties. In response to the mass email, Brehmer stated that he did not write, nor endorse the email. Brehmer wrote, "It's just something they do. Send out e-mails and sign my name to them without my knowledge. I will always be on the side of the musicians."

During the majority of Brehmer's time on the morning drive time slot at WXRT, he was partnered with news anchor Mary L. Dixon, until decisions by WXRT's new ownership in late 2019 prompted Brehmer to move to mid-days, and Dixon to leave WXRT for the Chicago NPR station WBEZ.

Brehmer described himself on air as "your best friend in the whole world", and frequently told listeners "it's great to be alive"

=== Lin's Bin ===
In 2002, Brehmer began writing and broadcasting essays entitled Lin's Bin. The essays were developed from responding to listeners' letters and continued as responses to email. Each year, Brehmer wrote just under a hundred essays, and he stated that in total he had written approximately 1800 pages of Lin's Bin. The essays were written and pre-recorded with producer Peter Crozier.

== Personal life and death ==
Brehmer was married to Sara Farr, whom he met while at Colgate University.

Brehmer announced on the air on July 12, 2022, that he had prostate cancer and was taking a leave of absence from WXRT to undergo chemotherapy. He returned to the air for several weeks in November and December 2022. Brehmer died on January 22, 2023, and his death was announced to WXRT listeners that morning by his long-time colleague Terri Hemmert. He was 68.

On the day of his death, the Chicago Cubs noted his death with the message "Lin Brehmer, 1954–2023" on the Wrigley Field marquee sign. Former Chicago Mayor Rahm Emanuel tweeted "Lin Brehmer was the voice of Chicago. His voice was unique and a perfect way to start the day. An ambassador for the city's music scene and a dear friend, I announced the Uptown music district concept on his show. I'll miss hearing his voice on XRT. May his memory be a blessing." The next day, the Chicago Tribune editorialized "He was mourned at the Metro, by Wilco, at the Art Institute of Chicago and by the Candelite tavern on Western Avenue. He was at ease with all of them." Brehmer was memorialized in a WXRT broadcast, January 23, 2023, hosted by Terri Hemmert, Marty Lennartz, Johnny Mars, Frank E. Lee, Ryan Arnold and Annalisa."
