= Honkawa Elementary School Peace Museum =

Museum in Hiroshima, Japan

Coordinates: 34.395885°N 132.450606°E

Honkawa Elementary School Peace Museum 本川小学校平和資料館
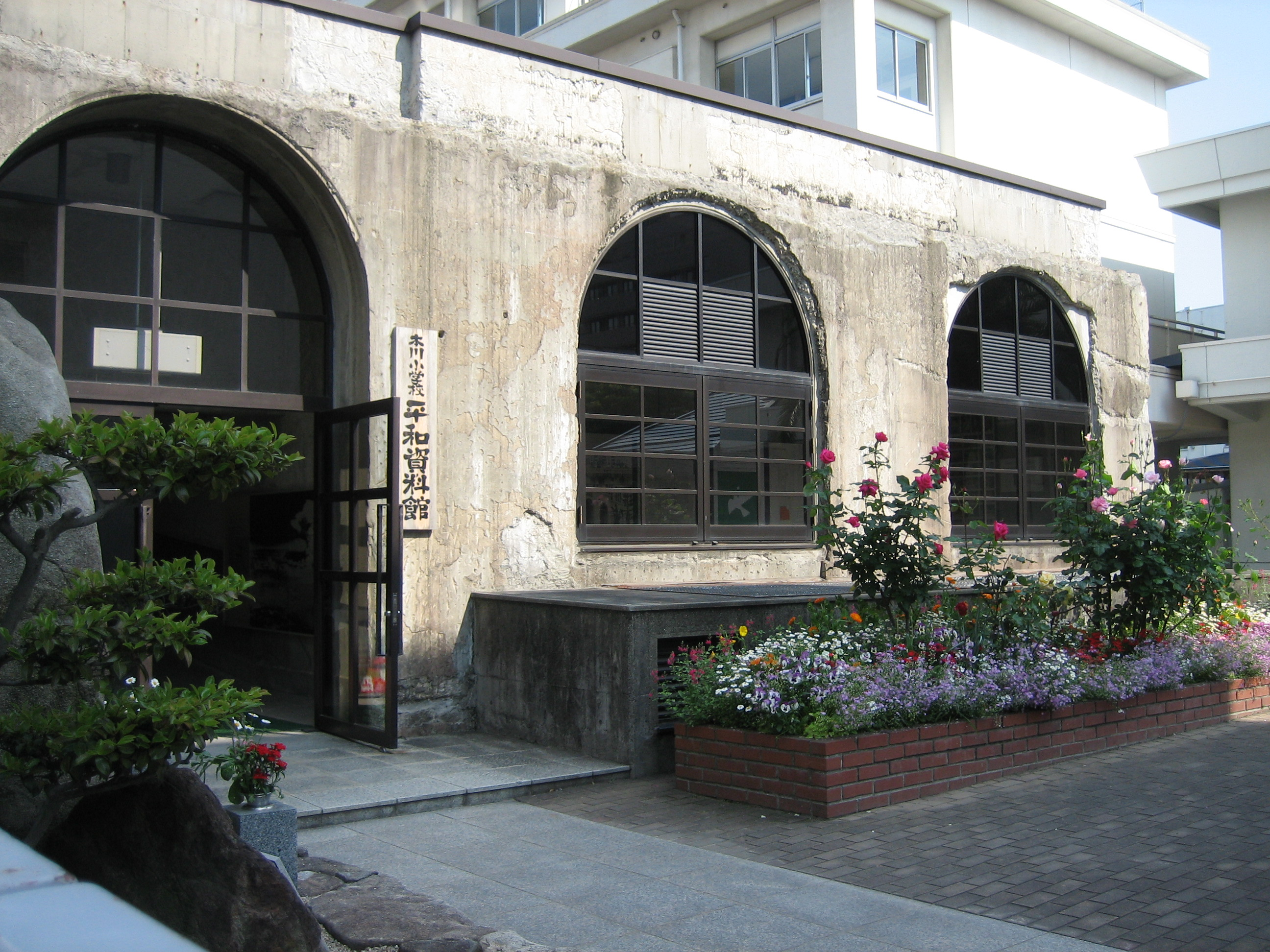
- Established: June 1, 1873, built in July 1928, opened as a museum in April 1988
- Location: 5-39, Honkawacho 1-chome, Naka-ku, Hiroshima
- Website: honkawa-e.edu.city.hiroshima.jp plala.or.jp/honkawa-pta

The Honkawa Elementary School Peace Museum (本川小学校平和資料館 Honkawa Shogakkou Heiwa Shiryokan) is a museum of the Peace in Honkawacho, Naka-ku, Hiroshima, Japan.

The school was the closest school to ground zero of the Hiroshima bombing. They lost about 400 students and more than 10 teachers, and the building took great amounts of damage from the atomic bomb dropped on August 6, 1945.

The Peace Museum is the part of the school building with the basement of the former Hiroshima City Honkawa Elementary School; it is kept as a place to learn about the importance of peace. The museum is operated by the Honkawa Elementary School PTA, as well as former members of the PTA, and is cleaned and maintained by the students.

The memorial service for the students and teachers killed in the blast is held every August 5 at the school. The school has also appeared in the manga Barefoot Gen, written by Keiji Nakazawa.

== History ==
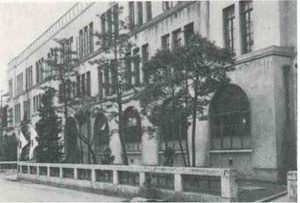
Before the atomic bomb around 1935

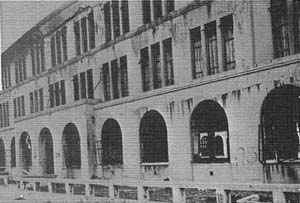
After the atomic bomb

The school opened in the Myocho-ji, a temple of the Nichiren sect, on January 10, 1873. They built an independent schoolhouse at the current address in 1884. In July 1928 the school constructed a new building, which was the first reinforced concrete school building in Hiroshima.

During World War II students in third grade or older were evacuated to another school in the suburbs in April 1945. A few months later, on August 6, 1945, about 400 students and more than 10 teachers were killed by the atomic bomb that was dropped on Hiroshima. In February 1946 the school reopened with 45 students with 4 teachers, but they didn't have any school supplies and the building still hadn't been fully repaired. In 1947 Reverend Arthur Powell Davies encouraged his congregation at the All Souls Church to donate half a ton of school supplies to Honkawa Elementary school. The students drew pictures in thanks, and sent them to the All Souls Church.

In June 1947 the school was renamed as Hiroshima City Honkawa Elementary School. In 1950 it was designated as the "School of the Peace Memorial City" by the Ministry of Education. The new school building was built and part of the old building was opened as the Peace Museum in April 1988. A memorial for the atomic bomb victims was built in November 1998.

The total number of visitors for the museum reached 100,000 in September 1998. A collection of the stories about the atomic bomb, Negai was written in March 2005. Students participated in the Hiroshima Peace Memorial Ceremony and performed the Commitment to Peace as the Children's representatives on August 6, 2005. Most recently, cherry trees were planted in remembrance of the bombing in March 2006.

== Museum ==
=== Exhibitions ===
- Photographs
- Pictures and calligraphy by students of the school
- Damaged objects
- Thousand Paper Cranes from schools and people

=== Education programs ===
- Volunteer Guide Services - appointment is required in advance
  - by the atomic bomb survivors for the visitors
  - by the students of the school for the students visiting from other schools

== See also ==
- Hiroshima City Honkawa Elementary School
- Barefoot Gen - Honkawa appears in the story
- Fukuromachi Elementary School Peace Museum - the school has same history and the peace museum
