= Terri Hemmert =

American radio personality

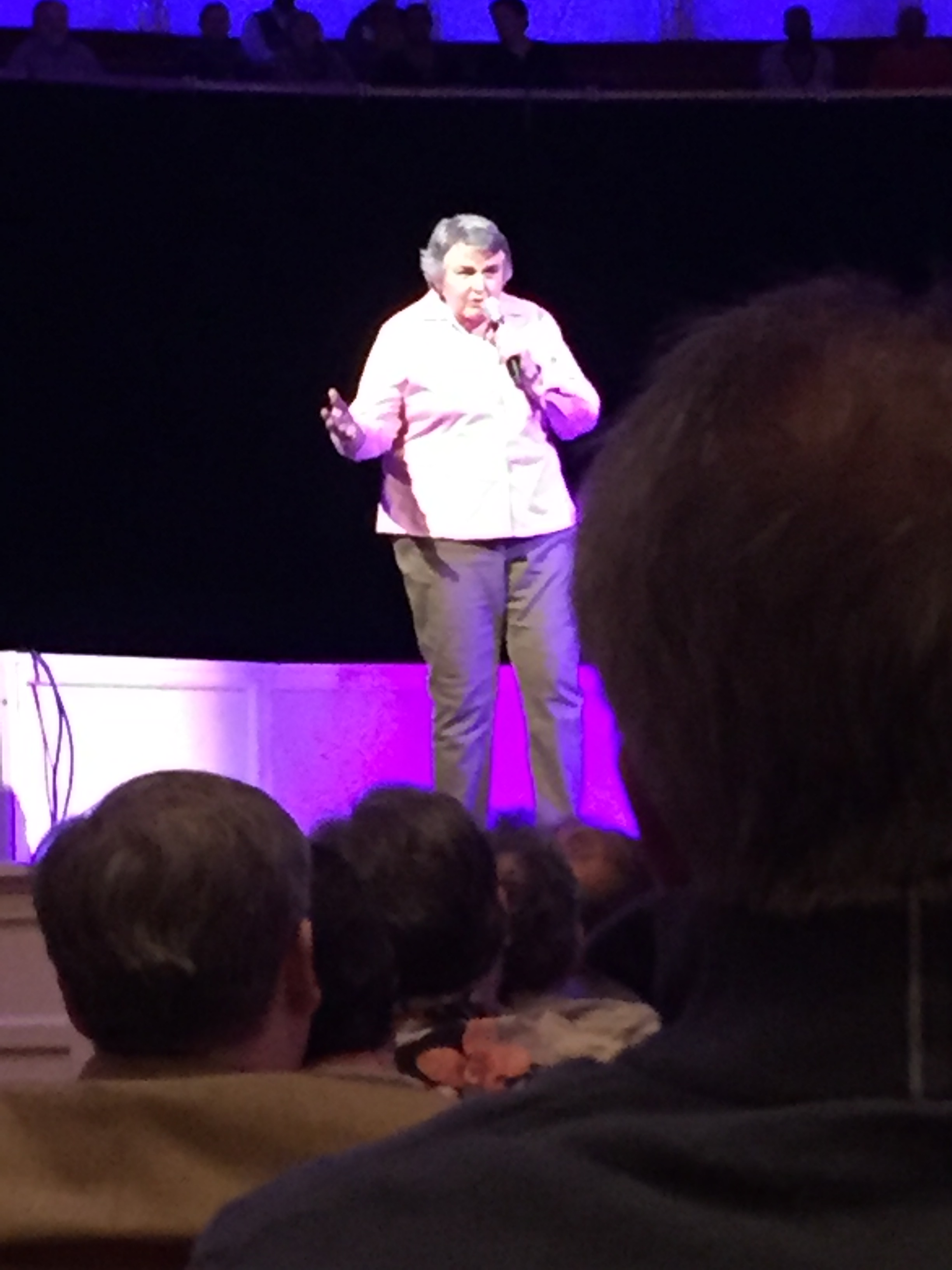
- Terri Hemmert in 2017
- Born: April 28, 1948 (age 78)
- Education: Elmhurst College (BA)
- Occupations: Radio personality, musicologist, and educator
- Employer: 93XRT Chicago

Terri Hemmert (born April 28, 1948) is an American radio personality, musicologist, and instructor at Columbia College Chicago. She is a long-term presence at WXRT-FM in Chicago, Illinois where she became the first female drive time host for a rock music station in the Chicago radio market. She is known as an expert on The Beatles and hosts the weekly Breakfast with the Beatles program and has been featured speaker at many Beatles conventions worldwide.

== Biography ==
Hemmert grew up in Piqua, Ohio. As a youth she saw The Beatles on The Ed Sullivan Show and was inspired to set her sights on a career as a disc jockey as a potential way to meet her idols. She maintained her interest in pop and rhythm and blues music through her teens and enrolled at Elmhurst College, where she wrote for campus publications and worked at the college radio station WRSE; she received a bachelor's degree in speech in 1970. After a stint as a late-night disc jockey at WCMF in Rochester, New York, she returned to the Midwest and, in 1973, joined fledgling progressive rock station WXRT in Chicago as Public Affairs Director and overnight announcer.

Hemmert's career and popularity grew along with that of the station and by 1981 she was the morning drive-time personality for the highly rated station. Hemmert became the regular celebrity host for the Chicago-area Beatlefest beginning in 1979. Also in the late 1970s she began a long association with Columbia College, where she taught music history and radio classes.

Hemmert has been active in social and political causes and sits on the board of directors for The Peace Museum and Facets Multimedia. She has also co-hosted the Chicago Pride Parade.

Hemmert was featured in the Rock and Roll Hall of Fame's "Rock and Radio" exhibit and received a Lifetime Achievement Award from the Chicago chapter of the Recording Academy.

Terri Hemmert was inducted into the Radio Hall of Fame in 2010 for her contributions to the radio medium. It was even of greater significance as she is one of a few female personalities to be bestowed this honor.

Though she has been known for her avid love of The Beatles, Hemmert also lists Roxy Music, Dusty Springfield, Patti Smith, and Marvin Gaye among her other favorite musicians.

In celebration of her 40 years at WXRT, Mayor Rahm Emanuel made a surprise visit to WXRT studios to declare December 18, 2013 "Terri Hemmert Day" in the City of Chicago.

November 3, 2023 was proclaimed Terri Hemmert Day by the Chicago City Council. In addition, the WXRT's broadcast and production facility changed its name to the Terri Hemmert Studios.
