= International Network of Museums for Peace =

The International Network of Museums for Peace (originally the International Network of Peace Museums) was established following a conference in Bradford in 1992. At this conference, for the first time, directors and curators of peace and anti-war museums worldwide came together. The loose network which emerged aimed to promote cooperation between peace museums and to stimulate the creation of new peace museums across the world.

== Background ==
=== Early years ===
Between 1992 and 2009, the network operated informally, maintained through occasional newsletters and international conferences. As peace museums proliferated globally, the need for formal structures grew. Steps towards addressing this were taken at the Gernika conference of 2005, including changing the name of the organisation to the International Network of Museums for Peace (INMP).

=== 2009-2018 ===
In 2009 the INMP was established as a foundation (nonprofit) in The Hague and, with the support of the municipality, opened its secretariat and archive in the Bertha von Suttner Building near the Peace Palace in 2010. Since 2014 the INMP, as an international NGO, has been granted special Consultative Status from the UN ECOSOC, and gained ANBI-status in the Netherlands. The foundation consists of a General Coordinator, ten international Executive Board members and twelve international members in the Advisory Committee. In 2018, the INMP Office in the Hague was closed, and moved to the Kyoto Museum for World Peace at Ritsumeikan University, Kyoto, Japan.

=== Museums for Peace ===
The definition of Museums for Peace according to the INMP is non-profit educational institutions that promote a culture of peace through interpreting, collecting and displaying peace related material. They inform the public about peace and nonviolence using illustrations from the lives of individuals, the work of organizations, campaigns and historical events. Included are also peace related sites, centers and institutions which are involved in peace education through exhibitions, documentation and other related activities.

=== Aims ===
Since 1992 the aims of the INMP have been

1. to promote cooperation between peace museums and
2. to stimulate the creation of new peace museums across the world. However, with the establishment of the INMP as a foundation, five more aims have been added.
3. To the secretariat, to make a mainstay in the daily operation and development of the INMP and
4. to recruit an extensive database of Museums for Peace. As well as
5. organizing international conferences
6. educational projects and
7. travelling exhibitions on the promotion and stimulation of peace.

== Conferences of the network ==
1992: Bradford (UK)
1995: Stadtschlaining (Austria)
1998: Osaka & Kyoto (Japan)
2003: Ostend (Belgium)
2005: Gernika-Lumo (Spain)
2008: Kyoto & Hiroshima (Japan)
2011: Barcelona (Spain)
2014: No Gun Ri (Korea)
2017: Belfast (Northern Ireland)

== Projects ==
Discover Peace in Europe
Three year (2013-2015) European project with six European partners, funded by the European Commission - Lifelong Learning Programme 2007-2013. It is a project about peace trails in Berlin, Budapest, Manchester, Paris, The Hague, Torino and Vienna to make people aware of the importance of peace. The INMP is the organiser of Peace Trail The Hague.
Peace Philanthropy - Then and Now. In the Footsteps of Andrew Carnegie
An international travelling exhibition to celebrate the centenary of the Peace Palace in The Hague (28 August 2013).
A Picture for Peace
An international travelling exhibition based on the 2012 International Day of Peace youth photo competition by the United Network of Young Peacebuilders (UNOY Peacebuilders).

== Other publications by the network ==
1995: Peace Museums Worldwide (Geneva United Nations Publications on Peace; League of Nations Archives, Geneva, in association with the Department of Peace Studies, University of Bradford)
1998: Peace Museums Worldwide (Geneva United Nations Publications on Peace; League of Nations Archives, Geneva, in association with the Department of Peace Studies, University of Bradford)
2008: Museums for Peace Worldwide (Kyoto Museum for World Peace, Ritsumeikan University)
1993 - 2002: International Network of Peace Museums Newsletter (Published by Give Peace a Chance Trust, Hertford, UK; Editorial Office: Department of Peace Studies, University of Bradford, UK)
2010 - current: International Network of Museums for Peace Newsletter (Published by the International Network of Museums for Peace)

2017: Conference Report from Belfast: https://sites.google.com/site/inmpconference/
