= List of works by Fujishima Takeji =

Japanese painter

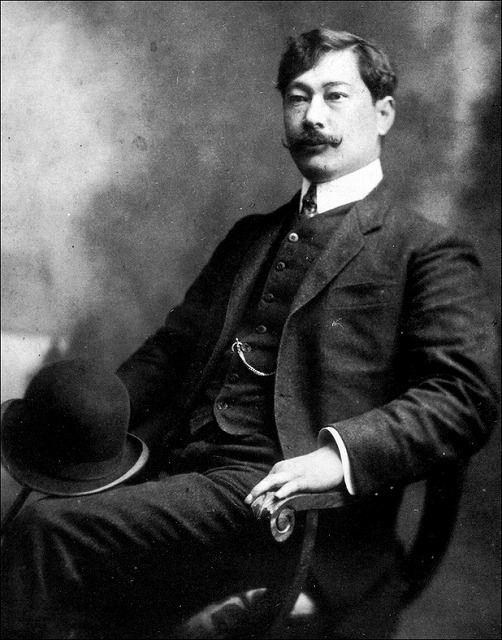
Fujishima Takeji 1905–1910

This is a list of works by Japanese painter Fujishima Takeji (1867–1943).

Work (Note: English versions of the original Japanese are from reliable sources where available; other translations are provisional.)	Medium	Date	Ownership	Comments	Image	Dimensions	Subject	Ref.
Figure of Kannon 観音像; Kannon zō	watercolour and pencil on paper	1892	Okawa Museum of Art			24.0 centimetres (9.4 in) by 20.7 centimetres (8.1 in)	Buddhist	
Kannon 観音図; Kannon zu	ink on paper	c.1892	Okawa Museum of Art			22.7 centimetres (8.9 in) by 14.9 centimetres (5.9 in)	Buddhist	
Female Figure 婦人像 fujin zō	ink on paper	1892–3	Okawa Museum of Art			16.9 centimetres (6.7 in) by 10.7 centimetres (4.2 in)	Figure	
Hunt for Cherry Blossoms 桜狩 sakura-gari	ink on paper	1892–3	Okawa Museum of Art			8.6 centimetres (3.4 in) by 12.8 centimetres (5.0 in)	Figure	
Woman Holding a Fan 扇をもてる女 ōgi o moteru onna	ink on paper	1892–3	Okawa Museum of Art			16.8 centimetres (6.6 in) by 10.0 centimetres (3.9 in)	Figure	
Hunt for Cherry Blossoms (Woman Standing) 桜狩（婦人立像） sakura-gari (fujin ritsu-zō)	ink on paper	1892–3	Okawa Museum of Art			10.5 centimetres (4.1 in) by 13.6 centimetres (5.4 in)	Figure	
Hunt for Cherry Blossoms 桜狩図 sakura-gari zu	ink on paper	1892–3	Okawa Museum of Art			9.9 centimetres (3.9 in) by 13.4 centimetres (5.3 in)	Figure	
Beauty under a Cherry 桜の美人 sakura no bijin	oil on canvas	c. 1892–3	Sekisui Museum (石水博物館)			56.0 centimetres (22.0 in) by 38.0 centimetres (15.0 in)	Figure	
Hunt for Cherry Blossoms (study) 桜狩（習作） sakura-gari (shūsaku)	oil on canvas	c. 1893	Kagoshima City Museum of Art			67 centimetres (26 in) by 42.5 centimetres (16.7 in)	Figure	
Hunt for Cherry Blossoms 桜狩 sakura-gari	oil on canvas	1893		lost in the 1923 Great Kantō earthquake		162.0 centimetres (63.8 in) by 97.0 centimetres (38.2 in)	Figure	
Woman Viewing Blossoms 花見の女 hanami no onna	oil on canvas	c. 1893					Figure	
Female Figure 婦人像 fujin zō	charcoal on paper	1893–4	Sekisui Museum (石水博物館)			58.0 centimetres (22.8 in) by 43.5 centimetres (17.1 in)	Figure	
Single Glance, Wind and Moon 一竿風月 ikkan fugetsu	oil	1895					Landscape	
Girl 少女 shōjo	oil	1895					Figure	
Threshing Rice 稲こぎ ine kogi	watercolour	1896					Figure	
Spring Stream 春の小川 haru no ogawa	watercolour on paper	1896	The University Art Museum, Tokyo University of the Arts (東京芸術大学大学美術館)			23.6 centimetres (9.3 in) by 31.0 centimetres (12.2 in)	Landscape	
A Stroll 逍遥 shōyō	oil on canvas	1897	The University Art Museum, Tokyo University of the Arts (東京芸術大学大学美術館)			39.4 centimetres (15.5 in) by 50.0 centimetres (19.7 in)	Figure	
Reading 読書 dokusho	oil	1897					Figure	
Evening Breeze at a Lakeside 池畔納涼 chihan nōryō		1897					Figure	
Evening Breeze at a Lakeside 池畔納涼 chihan nōryō	oil on canvas	1898	The University Art Museum, Tokyo University of the Arts (東京芸術大学大学美術館)			152.0 centimetres (59.8 in) by 194.4 centimetres (76.5 in)	Figure	
Seaside Landscape 海浜風景 kaihin fūkei	oil on panel					21.9 centimetres (8.6 in) by 31.0 centimetres (12.2 in)	Landscape	
Garden in the Snow 雪の庭 yuki no niwa	oil on canvas board					32.7 centimetres (12.9 in) by 23.8 centimetres (9.4 in)	Landscape	
Beside the Pond 池畔 chihan	oil on canvas board					24.0 centimetres (9.4 in) by 18.7 centimetres (7.4 in)	Figure	
Morning at the Beach 浜辺の朝 hamabe no asa	oil on canvas	1898	The University Art Museum, Tokyo University of the Arts (東京芸術大学大学美術館)			41.9 centimetres (16.5 in) by 56.2 centimetres (22.1 in)	Landscape	
Beach 浜辺 hamabe	oil on panel	1898	Marubeni Corporation			24 centimetres (9.4 in) by 33 centimetres (13 in)	Landscape	
Beach 浜辺 hamabe	oil on panel	1898	Mie Prefectural Art Museum			23.5 centimetres (9.3 in) by 32.5 centimetres (12.8 in)	Landscape	
Nude 裸婦 rafu	charcoal on paper	1898	Mie Prefectural Art Museum			62.5 centimetres (24.6 in) by 48.3 centimetres (19.0 in)	Figure	
Seaside Landscape 海浜風景 kaihin fūkei	oil on panel		Reimeikan, Kagoshima Prefectural Center for Historical Material			23.3 centimetres (9.2 in) by 32.9 centimetres (13.0 in)	Landscape	
Inlet 入江 irie	oil on panel					23.1 centimetres (9.1 in) by 32.8 centimetres (12.9 in)	Landscape	
Flowers 花 hana	oil on panel	1899	The University Art Museum, Tokyo University of the Arts (東京芸術大学大学美術館)			32.8 centimetres (12.9 in) by 23.6 centimetres (9.3 in)	Flowers	
Maiden 乙女 otome	pencil on paper					15.8 centimetres (6.2 in) by 10.0 centimetres (3.9 in)	Figure	
Nude 裸婦 rafu	oil on canvas	1901				62 centimetres (24 in) by 37 centimetres (15 in)	Figure	
Artificial Flowers 造花 zōka	oil on canvas	1901	The University Art Museum, Tokyo University of the Arts (東京芸術大学大学美術館)			136.5 centimetres (53.7 in) by 94.0 centimetres (37.0 in)	Figure	
At the Festival (Ennichi) 縁日で ennnichi-de	pencil on paper	c. 1901	Aichi Prefectural Museum of Art			15.2 centimetres (6.0 in) by 10.0 centimetres (3.9 in)	Figure	
Illustrations for Midaregami みだれ髪; Midaregami		published 15 August 1901		cover of Waseda University Library copy of Yosano Akiko's Tangled Hair pictured; three dots for the homonym mi are followed by hiragana だ and れ and the kanji 髪			Illustration	
Illustrations for Myōjō 明星; Myōjō		from 1901		February 1901, April 1902, and February 1904 covers pictured			Illustration	
Six Themes about Music 音楽六題 ongaku roku-dai	watercolour on paper	1901–1906		tsuzumi, biwa, fue, shamisen, violin, and piano		8.9 centimetres (3.5 in) by 8.1 centimetres (3.2 in); 9.1 centimetres (3.6 in) by 8.0 centimetres (3.1 in); 9.3 centimetres (3.7 in) by 8.0 centimetres (3.1 in); 7.1 centimetres (2.8 in) by 8.2 centimetres (3.2 in); 8.5 centimetres (3.3 in); 9.3 centimetres (3.7 in) by 8.3 centimetres (3.3 in)	Figure	
Self-portrait 自画像 jigazō	pen and ink on paper	1902				16.0 centimetres (6.3 in) by 14.5 centimetres (5.7 in)	Self-portrait	
Reminiscence of the Tempyō Era 天平の面影; Tempyō no omokage	oil on canvas	1902	Ishibashi Museum of Art (石橋美術館)	Important Cultural Property		197.5 centimetres (77.8 in) by 94.0 centimetres (37.0 in)	Figure	
Brinemaidens 潮汲み shio-kumi	oil on panel	1890–1902	Kagoshima City Museum of Art	women drawing seawater to make salt feature in the Kokinshū as well as the Noh play Matsukaze		23.8 centimetres (9.4 in) by 33.0 centimetres (13.0 in)	Landscape	
Nude and Peach Blossoms 桃花裸婦 momoka rafu	oil on panel	c. 1902	Hiroshima Museum of Art			91.0 centimetres (35.8 in) by 61.0 centimetres (24.0 in)	Figure	
Woman Playing a Mandolin マンドリンを弾く女 mandorin o hajiku onna	oil on canvas					46 centimetres (18 in) by 38 centimetres (15 in)	Figure	
Self-portrait 自画像 jigazō	oil on canvas	c. 1903	Ishibashi Museum of Art (石橋美術館)			46.0 centimetres (18.1 in) by 33.4 centimetres (13.1 in)	Self-portrait	
Butterflies 蝶 chō	oil on canvas	1904	private	displayed at the ninth Hakubakai exhibition in 1904		43.5 centimetres (17.1 in) by 43.5 centimetres (17.1 in)	Figure	
Dream 夢想 musō	oil on canvas	1904	Yokosuka Museum of Art			45.7 centimetres (18.0 in) by 33.4 centimetres (13.1 in)	Figure	
Woman with Morning Glories 婦人と朝顔 fujin to asagao	oil on canvas	1904	private				Figure	
Illustrations for Little Fan 小扇; Ko-ōgi		published 15 January 1904		cover of Waseda University Library copy of Yosano Akiko's text pictured			Illustration	
Illustrations for Poison Grass 毒草; Dokugusa		published 2 September 1904		cover of Rijksmuseum copy of Yosano Tekkan and Yosano Akiko's text pictured			Illustration	
Nude 裸婦 rafu	oil on canvas	c. 1906	Mie Prefectural Art Museum			79.6 centimetres (31.3 in) by 75.4 centimetres (29.7 in)	Figure	
Woman in a Bathroom 浴室の女 yokushitsu no onna	oil on canvas	c. 1906	Museum of Fine Arts, Gifu			48.8 centimetres (19.2 in) by 32.0 centimetres (12.6 in)	Figure	
Male Nude 浜辺の朝 otoko ratai	oil on canvas	c.1906	The University Art Museum, Tokyo University of the Arts (東京芸術大学大学美術館)			80.0 centimetres (31.5 in) by 57.4 centimetres (22.6 in)	Figure	
Jardin du Luxembourg リュクサンブール公園; Ryukusanbūru kōen	oil on canvas	1906–7				45.4 centimetres (17.9 in) by 60.6 centimetres (23.9 in)	Landscape	
Landscape of Versailles ヴェルサイユ風景; Verusaiyu fūkei	oil on canvas	1906–7	Ishibashi Museum of Art (石橋美術館)			72.7 centimetres (28.6 in) by 91.0 centimetres (35.8 in)	Landscape	
Autumn at Versailles ヴェルサイユの秋; Verusaiyu no aki	oil	1906–7				48 centimetres (19 in) by 59 centimetres (23 in)	Landscape	
Riverbanks of the Seine セーヌ河畔; Sēnu kahan	oil on canvas	1906–7	Mie Prefectural Art Museum			37.5 centimetres (14.8 in) by 53.1 centimetres (20.9 in)	Landscape	
Portrait of a European Lady 西洋婦人像 seiyō fujin zō	oil on canvas	1906–7	Menard Art Museum			38.2 centimetres (15.0 in) by 36.1 centimetres (14.2 in)	Figure	
Study of a Nude 裸体習作 ratai shūsaku	oil on canvas	1906–7	Kagoshima City Museum of Art	Municipal Cultural Property		80.5 centimetres (31.7 in) by 53.9 centimetres (21.2 in)	Figure	
Study of a Nude 裸体習作（側面全身） ratai shūsaku (sokumen zenshin)	oil on canvas	1906–7		full length, viewed from the side		80.2 centimetres (31.6 in) by 64.9 centimetres (25.6 in)	Figure	
Happy Morning 幸ある朝 sachiaru asa	oil on canvas	1908	Sen-oku Hakuko Kan			148.5 centimetres (58.5 in) by 93.5 centimetres (36.8 in)	Figure	
Portrait of an Italian Lady イタリア婦人像; Itaria fujin zō	oil on canvas	1908	Fukuoka Art Museum			145.0 centimetres (57.1 in) by 65.0 centimetres (25.6 in)	Figure	
Yacht ヨット yotto	oil on canvas	1908	The University Art Museum, Tokyo University of the Arts (東京芸術大学大学美術館)			33.0 centimetres (13.0 in) by 23.7 centimetres (9.3 in)	Landscape	
Windy Day 風吹く日 kaze fuku hi	oil on panel	1908	private			23.6 centimetres (9.3 in) by 32.8 centimetres (12.9 in)	Landscape	
Lake Léman レマン湖; Leman-ko	oil on panel	1908	Mie Prefectural Art Museum			23.6 centimetres (9.3 in) by 33.0 centimetres (13.0 in)	Landscape	
Rome ローマ風景; Rōma fūkei	oil on panel	1908	Mie Prefectural Art Museum			15.8 centimetres (6.2 in) by 22.0 centimetres (8.7 in)	Landscape	
Fountain in Rome ローマの噴水; Rōma no funsui	oil on canvas board	1908	Mie Prefectural Art Museum			23.8 centimetres (9.4 in) by 32.7 centimetres (12.9 in)	Landscape	
Lake Nemi ネミ湖; Nemi-ko	oil on panel	1908	Ishibashi Museum of Art (石橋美術館)				Landscape	
Cypress (Villa Falconieri, Frascati) 糸杉（フラスカティ、ヴィラ・ファルコニエリ） itosugi (Furasukati, Vira Farukonieri)	oil on panel	1908	Pola Museum of Art			36.9 centimetres (14.5 in) by 19.7 centimetres (7.8 in)	Landscape	
Venetian Landscape ヴェニス風景; Venisu fūkei	oil on panel	1908	Seki Art Gallery (せき美術館)			32.5 centimetres (12.8 in) by 23.5 centimetres (9.3 in)	Landscape	
Fountain in Rome ローマの噴水; Rōma no funsui	ink on paper	1908–9	Kagoshima City Museum of Art			17.5 centimetres (6.9 in) by 12.5 centimetres (4.9 in)	Landscape	
Horse-drawn Carriage in Rome ローマの馬車; Rōma no basha	watercolour on paper	1908–9	Kagoshima City Museum of Art			11 centimetres (4.3 in) by 15 centimetres (5.9 in)	Landscape	
Fountain 噴水 funsui	oil on panel	1908–9	Kagoshima City Museum of Art	said to be at the Villa d'Este		32.0 centimetres (12.6 in) by 22.5 centimetres (8.9 in)	Landscape	
Landscape of Assisi アッシジ風景; Asshiji fūkei	oil on panel	1908–9	Yokosuka Museum of Art			23.3 centimetres (9.2 in) by 33.0 centimetres (13.0 in)	Landscape	
Black Fan 黒扇 kokusen	oil on canvas	1908–9	Bridgestone Museum of Art	Important Cultural Property		42.4 centimetres (16.7 in) by 63.7 centimetres (25.1 in)	Figure	
The Sea, Italy イタリアの海; Itaria no umi	oil on panel	1908–9	Ishibashi Museum of Art (石橋美術館)				Landscape	
Venetian Landscape ヴェニス風景; Venisu fūkei	oil on panel	1908–9	Kasama Nichidō Museum of Art (笠間日動美術館)			23.5 centimetres (9.3 in) by 33 centimetres (13 in)	Landscape	
Clouds (Rome) 雲(ローマ) kumo (Rōma)	oil on canvas	c. 1908–9	Ishibashi Museum of Art (石橋美術館)			22.1 centimetres (8.7 in) by 38.1 centimetres (15.0 in)	Landscape	
Portrait of Western Woman 西洋婦人像 seiyō fujin zō	oil on canvas	c. 1908–9	Iwami Art Museum			58.3 centimetres (23.0 in) by 39.1 centimetres (15.4 in)	Figure	
Portrait of an Italian Woman イタリア婦人像; Itaria fujin zō	oil on canvas	c. 1908–9	The University Art Museum, Tokyo University of the Arts (東京芸術大学大学美術館)			64.9 centimetres (25.6 in) by 55.0 centimetres (21.7 in)	Figure	
Ciociara チョチャラ; Chochara	oil on canvas	c. 1908–9	Ishibashi Museum of Art (石橋美術館)			45.5 centimetres (17.9 in) by 38.0 centimetres (15.0 in)	Figure	
Drawing of a Nude 裸婦デッサン rafu dessan	pencil on paper	c. 1908–9	The University Art Museum, Tokyo University of the Arts (東京芸術大学大学美術館)			30.0 centimetres (11.8 in) by 22.5 centimetres (8.9 in)	Figure	
Pond at Villa d'Este, Tivoli ティボリ、ヴィラ･デステの池; Tibori, Vira d'Esute no ike	oil on canvas	1909	The University Art Museum, Tokyo University of the Arts (東京芸術大学大学美術館)			46.6 centimetres (18.3 in) by 53.7 centimetres (21.1 in)	Landscape	
Clouds (Rome) 雲（ローマ） kumo (Rōma)	oil on canvas	1908–9	Bridgestone Museum of Art			22.1 centimetres (8.7 in) by 38.1 centimetres (15.0 in)	Landscape	
Ruins of Rome ローマの遺跡; Rōma no iseki		1908–9					Landscape	
Cypresses (Villa Falconieri) 糸杉（ヴィラ・ファルコニエリ） itosugi (Vira Farukonieri)	oil on canvas	1908–9	Bridgestone Museum of Art			39.5 centimetres (15.6 in) by 36.6 centimetres (14.4 in)	Landscape	
Woman in Black Clothes 黒衣の婦人 kokui no fujin	oil on canvas	1909				60.8 centimetres (23.9 in) by 50.1 centimetres (19.7 in)	Figure	
Portrait of Mr. T T氏肖像; T-shi shōzō	oil on canvas	1909	Museum of Modern Art, Kamakura & Hayama			35.0 centimetres (13.8 in) by 26.0 centimetres (10.2 in)	Portrait	
House of the Vettii		c. 1909				34.5 centimetres (13.6 in) by 26.0 centimetres (10.2 in)	Landscape	
Italian Lakeside Landscape イタリア湖畔風景; Itaria kohan fūkei			Toyota				Landscape	
Copy of Pisanello's Portrait of Ginevra d'Este ピサネルロ＜ジネヴラ・デステの肖像＞模写; Pisaneruro Jinevura d'Esute no shōzō mosha	oil on canvas	Meiji period	Kagoshima City Museum of Art	almost identical in size to the original in the Louvre; the butterflies hark back to his 1904 painting while the profile of a woman in gorgeous clothing foreshadows his masterpieces of the 1920s		42 centimetres (17 in) by 32 centimetres (13 in)	Copy	
Portrait of Perugino ペルジーノ像; Perujīno zō	oil on canvas		The University Art Museum, Tokyo University of the Arts (東京芸術大学大学美術館)	after Raphael's Ritratto virile in the Galleria Borghese		47.9 centimetres (18.9 in) by 31.8 centimetres (12.5 in)	Copy	
Swiss Officers (detail from The Mass at Bolsena) スイス人の士官たち（ボルセーナのミサ 部分） Suisujin no shikantachi (Borusēna no misa bubun)	oil on canvas		The University Art Museum, Tokyo University of the Arts (東京芸術大学大学美術館)	after Raphael's painting in the Raphael Rooms		80.0 centimetres (31.5 in) by 75.2 centimetres (29.6 in)	Copy	
Pope Julius II (detail from The Mass at Bolsena) 教皇ユリウス二世 (ボルセーナのミサ 部分） kyōkō Yuriusu nisei (Borusēna no misa bubun)	oil on canvas		The University Art Museum, Tokyo University of the Arts (東京芸術大学大学美術館)	after Raphael's painting in the Raphael Rooms		63.5 centimetres (25.0 in) by 53.0 centimetres (20.9 in)	Copy	
Cockerel (detail from Saint Geneviève cycle) 鶏（サント· ジュヌヴィエーヴ 部分） niwatori (Santo Junuviēvu bubun)	oil on canvas		The University Art Museum, Tokyo University of the Arts (東京芸術大学大学美術館)	after Puvis de Chavannes' Vie Pastorale de Sainte Geneviève at the Panthéon		64.6 centimetres (25.4 in) by 80.5 centimetres (31.7 in)	Copy	
Woman Reading 書見する女 shokensuru onna	oil on canvas	1910	private			60.8 centimetres (23.9 in) by 50.5 centimetres (19.9 in)	Figure	
The Emperor's Visit to Tokyo Imperial University 東京帝国大学行幸; Tōkyō Teikoku Daigaku gyōkō		1912	Meiji Memorial Picture Gallery				Other	
Portrait of Orita Hikoichi 折田先生肖像; Orita sensei shōzō		1912	Kyoto University Archives			60 centimetres (24 in) by 50 centimetres (20 in)	Portrait	
Half Dreaming うつつ utsutsu	oil on canvas	1913	National Museum of Modern Art, Tokyo			64.0 centimetres (25.2 in) by 52.0 centimetres (20.5 in)	Figure	
Korean Landscape 朝鮮風景; Chōsen fūkei	oil on canvas	1913	Mie Prefectural Art Museum			63.5 centimetres (25.0 in) by 89.6 centimetres (35.3 in)	Landscape	
Korean Landscape 朝鮮風景; Chōsen fūkei	oil on canvas	1913	Yamazaki Art Museum (山崎美術館)			79.4 centimetres (31.3 in) by 116.6 centimetres (45.9 in)	Landscape	
Flower Basket 花籠 hanako	oil on canvas	1913	National Museum of Modern Art, Kyoto			63.0 centimetres (24.8 in) by 41.0 centimetres (16.1 in)	Figure	
Pattern of the Orient オリエントの模様; Oriento no moyō	pencil and ink on paper	c. 1913	Aichi Prefectural Museum of Art			6.6 centimetres (2.6 in) by 16.0 centimetres (6.3 in)	Figure	
Woman in Korean Dress 朝鮮服の女; Chōsen fuku no onna	pencil on paper	c. 1914	Aichi Prefectural Museum of Art			38.5 centimetres (15.2 in) by 24.8 centimetres (9.8 in)	Figure	
Woman in Korean Dress 朝鮮服の女; Chōsen fuku no onna	pencil on paper	c. 1914	Aichi Prefectural Museum of Art			35.0 centimetres (13.8 in) by 15.0 centimetres (5.9 in)	Figure	
Korean Woman 朝鮮婦人; Chōsen fujin	oil and pastel on paper	c. 1914	Ishibashi Museum of Art (石橋美術館)			77.9 centimetres (30.7 in) by 29.3 centimetres (11.5 in)	Figure	
Korean Woman 朝鮮婦人; Chōsen fujin	oil and pastel on paper	c. 1914	Ishibashi Museum of Art (石橋美術館)			77.9 centimetres (30.7 in) by 29.2 centimetres (11.5 in)	Figure	
Treasure Box 玉手箱 tamatebako							Figure	
Illustrations for From Summer to Autumn 夏より秋へ; Natsu yori aki e		published 1 January 1914		cover of Waseda University Library copy of Yosano Akiko's text pictured			Illustration	
Perfume 匂い nioi	oil on canvas	1915	National Museum of Modern Art, Tokyo			69.5 centimetres (27.4 in) by 76.0 centimetres (29.9 in)	Figure	
Morning Beside Lake Yamanaka 山中湖畔の朝; Yamanaka kohan no asa	oil on canvas	1916	Fukuoka Prefectural Museum of Art			60.7 centimetres (23.9 in) by 80.4 centimetres (31.7 in)	Landscape	
Beside Shinobazu Pond 上野不忍池畔; Shinobazu chihan	oil on panel		Toyohashi City Museum of Art and History			24.0 centimetres (9.4 in) by 33.4 centimetres (13.1 in)	Landscape	
Residue of Snowfall on the Embankment 大川端残雪 daikawabata zansetsu	oil on canvas	1917				60.4 centimetres (23.8 in) by 80.4 centimetres (31.7 in)	Landscape	
Artichoke アルチショ aruchisho	oil on canvas	1917	National Museum of Modern Art, Tokyo			89.5 centimetres (35.2 in) by 97.0 centimetres (38.2 in)	Still life	
Nude 裸婦 rafu	oil on canvas	c. 1917	Mie Prefectural Art Museum			45.2 centimetres (17.8 in) by 37.9 centimetres (14.9 in)	Figure	
Near the Campidoglio カンピドリオのあたり; Kanpidorio no atari	oil on canvas	1919	Osaka City Museum of Modern Art (大阪新美術館)	painted in the narrow vertical format of a hanging scroll, presumably from sketches, a decade after his return from Europe		188.0 centimetres (74.0 in) by 94.4 centimetres (37.2 in)	Landscape	
Saint 聖女 seijo	oil on panel	1920	Tanabe City Museum of Art (田辺市立美術館)			48.0 centimetres (18.9 in) by 21.6 centimetres (8.5 in)	Figure	
Portrait of Kimiko 公子像; Kimiko zō	oil on panel	c. 1920	Museum of Fine Arts, Gifu			44.2 centimetres (17.4 in) by 32.3 centimetres (12.7 in)	Portrait	
Court Lady with Takarabune 官女と宝船 kanjo to takarabune	oil on canvas	c. 1920	private			76.4 centimetres (30.1 in) by 69.8 centimetres (27.5 in)	Figure	
Woman's Face 女の顔 onna no kao		1921					Figure	
Amazon アマゾーヌ; Amazōnu	oil	1924				41.0 centimetres (16.1 in) by 33.8 centimetres (13.3 in)	Figure	
In the Oriental Manner 東洋振り; Tōyō-buri	oil on canvas	1924	private			63.7 centimetres (25.1 in) by 44.0 centimetres (17.3 in)	Figure	
Nude 裸婦 rafu	oil on canvas	Taishō era	Saga Prefectural Art Museum (佐賀県立美術館)			60.4 centimetres (23.8 in) by 50.0 centimetres (19.7 in)	Figure	
Semi-nude Female Figure 半裸婦人像 han-rafu-jin zō	oil	1926				44 centimetres (17 in) by 37 centimetres (15 in)	Figure	
Woman Holding an Orchid 芳恵 hōkei	oil	1926				65 centimetres (26 in) by 53 centimetres (21 in)	Figure	
Profile of a Woman 女の横顔 onna no yokogao	oil on panel	1926–7	Pola Museum of Art			45.8 centimetres (18.0 in) by 37.4 centimetres (14.7 in)	Figure	
Profile of a Girl 鉸剪眉 kōsenbi	oil on canvas	1927	Kagoshima City Museum of Art			51.8 centimetres (20.4 in) by 39.5 centimetres (15.6 in)	Figure	
Female Figure 婦人像 fujin zō		1927	Kasama Nichidō Museum of Art (笠間日動美術館)				Figure	
Chrysanthemums (Still Life Beside a Lake) 菊（湖畔静物） Kiku (kohan seibutsu)		1928					Still Life	
Sunrise over Mongolia 蒙古の日の出; Mōko no hinode		1928	Reimeikan, Kagoshima Prefectural Center for Historical Material				Landscape	
Drawing of a Nude 裸婦（デッサン） rafu (dessan)	pencil on paper	c. 1928	Kagoshima City Museum of Art			22 centimetres (8.7 in) by 27 centimetres (11 in)	Figure	
Distant View of Awaji-shima 淡路島遠望; Awajishima-enbō	oil on canvas	1929	Bridgestone Museum of Art			51.7 centimetres (20.4 in) by 71.2 centimetres (28.0 in)	Landscape	
Nude 裸婦 rafu	oil on canvas	1929	Kagoshima City Museum of Art			45.5 centimetres (17.9 in) by 37.9 centimetres (14.9 in)	Figure	
Sunrise (Toba, Mount Asama) 日の出（鳥羽・朝熊山） hinode (Toba Asama-yama)	oil on canvas	1930	Pola Museum of Art			40.9 centimetres (16.1 in) by 53.2 centimetres (20.9 in)	Landscape	
Sunrise (View from Mount Asama in Ise) 日の出（伊勢朝熊山からの眺望） hinode (Ise Asama-yama kara no chōbō)	oil on canvas	1930	Mie Prefectural Art Museum				Landscape	
Sunrise 日の出 hinode	oil on canvas	c. 1930–2	Pola Museum of Art			38.1 centimetres (15.0 in) by 45.4 centimetres (17.9 in)	Landscape	
Sunrise at Toba 鳥羽の日の出; Toba no hinode	oil on canvas	1931	Kagoshima City Museum of Art			72.6 centimetres (28.6 in) by 100.0 centimetres (39.4 in)	Landscape	
The Sea at Toba 鳥羽の海; Toba no umi			Toyota				Landscape	
Admiral Tōgō Visits Rozhestvensky ロジェストヴェンスキーを見舞う東郷元帥; Rojesutovensukī o mimau Tōgō gensui			Reimeikan, Kagoshima Prefectural Center for Historical Material				Figure	
Landscape of Cape Shiono 潮岬風景; Shiono-misaki no fūkei	oil on canvas	1931	Kagoshima City Museum of Art			33.8 centimetres (13.3 in) by 45.9 centimetres (18.1 in)	Landscape	
Rocks and Waves (Cape Shiono) 岩と波(潮岬) iwa to nami (Shiono-misaki)		1931	Museum of Kamei Collection (カメイ美術館)				Landscape	
The Sea at Sunrise 海（日の出） umi (hinode)	oil on canvas	1931	Mie Prefectural Art Museum			33.4 centimetres (13.1 in) by 45.8 centimetres (18.0 in)	Landscape	
Waves (Oarai) 浪(大洗) nami (oarai)	oil on canvas	1931	Ishibashi Museum of Art (石橋美術館)				Landscape	
Oarai 大洗 oarai	oil on canvas	c. 1931	Pola Museum of Art			33.5 centimetres (13.2 in) by 45.5 centimetres (17.9 in)	Landscape	
Sunrise 日の出 hinode	oil on canvas	c. 1931	Hiroshima Museum of Art			72.2 centimetres (28.4 in) by 100.3 centimetres (39.5 in)	Landscape	
Still Life with Lychees 龍眼肉静物(茘枝) ryūgan niku seibutsu (reishi)	oil on canvas	c. 1931	Uehara Museum of Modern Art			15.0 centimetres (5.9 in) by 22.6 centimetres (8.9 in)	Still life	
The Sea at Dawn 暁の海 akatsuki no umi		c. 1931–2	Menard Art Museum				Landscape	
Sunrise over the Eastern Sea 東海旭光; Tōkai kyokkō	oil on canvas	1932	Bridgestone Museum of Art			63.6 centimetres (25.0 in) by 88.8 centimetres (35.0 in)	Landscape	
Sunrise, Cape Daiō 大王岬の日の出; Daiō-misaki no hinode	oil on panel	1932	Pola Museum of Art			15.6 centimetres (6.1 in) by 22.7 centimetres (8.9 in)	Landscape	
Breaking Waves at Daiō Misaki Promontory 大王岬に打ち寄せる怒濤; Daiō-misaki ni uchiyoseru dotō	oil on canvas	1932	Mie Prefectural Art Museum			73.3 centimetres (28.9 in) by 100.0 centimetres (39.4 in)	Landscape	
Raging Billows at Daiō-misaki Promontory 大王岬に打寄せる怒濤; Daiō-misaki ni uchiyoseru dotō	oil on canvas	1932	Hiroshima Museum of Art			73.0 centimetres (28.7 in) by 91.0 centimetres (35.8 in)	Landscape	
Distant View from Yashima 屋島よりの遠望; Yashima yori no enbō	oil on canvas	1932	Ishibashi Museum of Art (石橋美術館)			52.9 centimetres (20.8 in) by 72.5 centimetres (28.5 in)	Landscape	
View from Yashima 屋島よりの展望; Yashima yori no tenbō	oil on canvas	1932	Kosugi Hōan Museum of Art, Nikkō (小杉放菴記念日光美術館)			53.0 centimetres (20.9 in) by 72.7 centimetres (28.6 in)	Landscape	
Setouchi Landscape 瀬戸内風景; Setouchi fūkei		1932	Museum of Kamei Collection (カメイ美術館)				Landscape	
Sunrise over Mount Goken 五剣山の日の出; Goken-zan no hinode		1932	The Kagawa Museum			37.8 centimetres (14.9 in) by 45.3 centimetres (17.8 in)	Landscape	
Sunrise over Mount Goken 五剣山の日の出; Goken-zan no hinode	oil on canvas	1932	Ishibashi Museum of Art (石橋美術館)				Landscape	
Rays of the Morning Sun (Mount Niitaka) 旭光(新高山) kyokkō (Niitaka-yama)	oil on canvas	1932	Ishibashi Museum of Art (石橋美術館)				Landscape	
Apricot Blossoms 杏花 kyōka		1933					Landscape	
Village with Apricot Blossoms 杏花 kyōka no mura	oil on panel	1933	Kagoshima City Museum of Art			15.5 centimetres (6.1 in) by 22.7 centimetres (8.9 in)	Landscape	
Nude in Blue Clothes 裸婦青衣 rafu seii	pastel on paper	1933	Kagoshima City Museum of Art			34 centimetres (13 in) by 27 centimetres (11 in)	Figure	
Boats of Taiwan 台湾の船; Taiwan no fune	pastel on paper	1933	Kagoshima City Museum of Art			16.1 centimetres (6.3 in) by 23.4 centimetres (9.2 in)	Landscape	
Landscape in the South of Taiwan 台南風景; Tainan fūkei	oil on canvas	1933	Museum of Modern Art, Kamakura & Hayama			40.9 centimetres (16.1 in) by 53.2 centimetres (20.9 in)	Landscape	
Taiwan Seibyō 聖廟(台南); Taiwan Seibyō	pastel on paper	1933	Kagoshima City Museum of Art			17 centimetres (6.7 in) by 26 centimetres (10 in)	Landscape	
The Shrine of Confucius, Tainan 聖廟(台南); Seibyō (Tainan)	oil on canvas	c. 1933	National Museum of Modern Art, Tokyo			39.5 centimetres (15.6 in) by 51.5 centimetres (20.3 in)	Landscape	
Rough Day 荒れる日 areru hi	oil on canvas	c. 1933	Uehara Museum of Modern Art			36.5 centimetres (14.4 in) by 53.4 centimetres (21.0 in)	Landscape	
Landscape of Nara 奈良風景; Nara fūkei	oil on canvas	1934	Ishibashi Museum of Art (石橋美術館)				Landscape	
Sunrise, Kōbe Port 神戸港の日の出; Kōbe-kō no hinode	oil on panel	1934	Pola Museum of Art			22.0 centimetres (8.7 in) by 27.0 centimetres (10.6 in)	Landscape	
Sunrise from the Top of the Mountain 山上の日の出 sanjō no hinode		1934	Museum of Modern Art, Toyama				Landscape	
Sunrise from the Top of the Mountain 山上の日の出 sanjō no hinode		1934	National Museum of Modern Art, Kyoto			91.7 centimetres (36.1 in) by 125.0 centimetres (49.2 in)	Landscape	
Butterflies 蝶 chō	ink on silk	1934	Kagoshima City Museum of Art			22 centimetres (8.7 in) by 28 centimetres (11 in)	Other	
Sunrise 日の出 hinode	oil on canvas	c. 1934	Mitsubishi			44.0 centimetres (17.3 in) by 51.8 centimetres (20.4 in)	Landscape	
Sunrise at a Harbour 港の朝陽 minato no asahi	oil on canvas	1935	National Museum of Modern Art, Tokyo			44.5 centimetres (17.5 in) by 59.5 centimetres (23.4 in)	Landscape	
Sunrise at the Port of Kobe 神戸港の朝陽; Kōbe-kō no asahi	oil on canvas	1935	Kyoto Municipal Museum of Art			49.0 centimetres (19.3 in) by 59.5 centimetres (23.4 in)	Landscape	
Distant View at Cape Muroto 室戸岬遠望; Muroto-misaki enbō	oil on canvas	1935				60.6 centimetres (23.9 in) by 45.2 centimetres (17.8 in)	Landscape	
Cape Muroto 室戸岬; Muroto-misaki	oil on canvas	1935				41 centimetres (16 in) by 53 centimetres (21 in)	Landscape	
Lighthouse at Cape Muroto 室戸岬の灯台; Muroto-misaki no tōdai	oil on canvas	1935				41 centimetres (16 in) by 53.2 centimetres (20.9 in)	Landscape	
Woman from Taiwan 台湾の女; Taiwan no onna		c. 1935	Menard Art Museum				Figure	
Daybreak at Niitakayama 新高山の暁; Niitakayama no akatsuki							Landscape	
Niitakayama 新高山; Niitakayama							Landscape	
Rays of the Morning Sun (Niitakayama) 旭光 （新高山） kyokkō (Niitakayama)	oil on canvas	1935	Bridgestone Museum of Art			38.0 centimetres (15.0 in) by 45.8 centimetres (18.0 in)	Landscape	
Spring Scene at Shōdo-shima 小豆島の春; Shōdoshima no haru	oil on canvas	1936	Pola Museum of Art			37.8 centimetres (14.9 in) by 45.5 centimetres (17.9 in)	Landscape	
Woman of the Ryūkyūs 琉球の女; Ryūkyū no onna	pastels on paper	1936	Ishibashi Museum of Art (石橋美術館)			38.3 centimetres (15.1 in) by 28.0 centimetres (11.0 in)	Landscape	
Highly Cultivated Hills 耕到天 tagayashite ten ni itaru	oil on canvas	1936	Kōriyama City Museum of Art			38.0 centimetres (15.0 in) by 45.7 centimetres (18.0 in)	Landscape	
Sunrise over Mongolia 蒙古の日の出; Mōko no hinode	oil on canvas	1937	Ishibashi Museum of Art (石橋美術館)			40.9 centimetres (16.1 in) by 53.0 centimetres (20.9 in)	Landscape	
Sunrise over Mongolia 蒙古の日の出; Mōko no hinode	pastel on paper	1937	Kagoshima City Museum of Art			26.5 centimetres (10.4 in) by 35.0 centimetres (13.8 in)	Landscape	
Sunrise over the Mongolian Plateau 蒙古高原の日の出; Mōko kōgen no hinode	pastel on paper	1937	Kagoshima City Museum of Art			26 centimetres (10 in) by 35 centimetres (14 in)	Landscape	
Magu, a Nymph in an Ancient Chinese Legend 麻姑献壽; Magu kenju	oil on canvas	1937	National Museum of Modern Art, Tokyo			45.6 centimetres (18.0 in) by 33.6 centimetres (13.2 in)	Figure	
Chinese Landscape 中国風景; Chūgoku fūkei	oil on canvas	1938	Kagoshima City Museum of Art	Municipal Cultural Property		73.0 centimetres (28.7 in) by 100.3 centimetres (39.5 in)	Landscape	
Site of Fierce Fighting at Suzhou Creek 蘇州河激戦の跡; Soshū-gawa gekisen no ato	oil on canvas	1938	Kasama Nichidō Museum of Art (笠間日動美術館)			94.0 centimetres (37.0 in) by 126.5 centimetres (49.8 in)	Landscape	
Land Cultivated to the Top 耕到天 tagayashite ten ni itaru	oil on canvas	1938	Menard Art Museum			68.5 centimetres (27.0 in) by 85.0 centimetres (33.5 in)	Landscape	
Highly Cultivated Hills 耕到天 tagayashite ten ni itaru	oil on canvas	1938	Ohara Museum of Art			91.0 centimetres (35.8 in) by 97.5 centimetres (38.4 in)	Landscape	
Inubōsaki Lighthouse 犬吠岬の灯台; Inubōsaki no tōdai	oil on canvas	1940				27.3 centimetres (10.7 in) by 45.5 centimetres (17.9 in)	Landscape	
Girl 少女 shōjo	oil on canvas	1940	Kagoshima City Museum of Art			45.5 centimetres (17.9 in) by 37.9 centimetres (14.9 in)	Figure	
View from a Window of the Huangpu River 窓より黄浦江を望む図 mado yori Kōhokō o nozomu zu	oil on canvas	1941	Tokyo National Museum			64.5 centimetres (25.4 in) by 90.3 centimetres (35.6 in)	Landscape	
Nude 裸婦 rafu	pastel on paper	1942	Kagoshima City Museum of Art			28 centimetres (11 in) by 19 centimetres (7.5 in)	Figure	
Landscape 風景 fūkei	pastel on paper		The University Art Museum, Tokyo University of the Arts (東京芸術大学大学美術館)			26.2 centimetres (10.3 in) by 34.2 centimetres (13.5 in)	Landscape	
Landscape 風景 fūkei	oil on canvas		Seki Art Gallery (せき美術館)			37.0 centimetres (14.6 in) by 44.0 centimetres (17.3 in)	Landscape	
Landscape (Mountain and Drams) 風景(山とトロッコ) fūkei (yama to torokko)	oil on canvas		Mitsubishi			38.2 centimetres (15.0 in) by 45.7 centimetres (18.0 in)	Landscape	
New Year's Day in the Harbour 港の正月 minato no shōgatsu	pastel on paper		Kagoshima City Museum of Art			14 centimetres (5.5 in) by 18 centimetres (7.1 in)	Landscape	
Road through the Forest at Nikkō 日光の林道; Nikkō no rindō	pencil on paper		Kagoshima City Museum of Art			23 centimetres (9.1 in) by 27 centimetres (11 in)	Landscape	
Girl in Red Clothes 赤布の少女 akanuno no shōjo	oil on paper		Kagoshima City Museum of Art			7.8 centimetres (3.1 in) by 6.3 centimetres (2.5 in)	Figure	
Female Portrait 婦人像 fujin zō			Nagashima Museum				Figure	
Chinese-style Triptych 唐様三部作; Karayō sanbusaku			Ishibashi Museum of Art (石橋美術館)				Figure	
Woman Riding a Horse 騎馬婦人像 kiba fujin zō							Figure	
Bust of a Female Nude 裸婦半身像 rafu hanshin zō	pencil on paper		Kagoshima City Museum of Art			18.1 centimetres (7.1 in) by 12.0 centimetres (4.7 in)	Figure	
Profile of a Miko 巫女横姿 miko yoko-sugata	watercolour on paper		Kagoshima City Museum of Art			24 centimetres (9.4 in) by 13 centimetres (5.1 in)	Figure	
Portrait of Yokote Chiyonosuke 横手千代之助像; Yokote Chiyonosuke zō	oil on canvas		University of Tokyo			71.3 centimetres (28.1 in) by 59.3 centimetres (23.3 in)	Portrait	
Portrait of Ichiki Otohiko 市来乙彦像; Ichiki Otohiko zō							Portrait	
Calm 静図 sei zu			Tokyo National Museum			88.2 centimetres (34.7 in) by 223 centimetres (88 in)	Landscape	
Still Life 静物 seibutsu							Still life	
Wind in the Bamboo 風竹 fūchiku	ink on silk		Kagoshima City Museum of Art			67 centimetres (26 in) by 75.5 centimetres (29.7 in)	Other	
Kannon Crossing the Sea 渡海観音 tokai Kannon	light colour on silk		Kagoshima City Museum of Art			129 centimetres (51 in) by 41 centimetres (16 in)	Other	
Protecting the Treasury 宝庫擁護 hōko yōgo	pencil on paper		Aichi Prefectural Museum of Art	see Tamamushi Shrine		11.0 centimetres (4.3 in) by 9.5 centimetres (3.7 in)	Figure	
Woman Biting her Finger 指をかむ女 yubi o kamu onna	pencil on paper		Aichi Prefectural Museum of Art			38.2 centimetres (15.0 in) by 29.0 centimetres (11.4 in)	Figure	
Woman in Japanese Dress 和服の女 wafuku no onna	pencil on paper		Aichi Prefectural Museum of Art			15.6 centimetres (6.1 in) by 21.9 centimetres (8.6 in)	Figure	
Woman Reading a Book 本を読む女 hon o yomu onna	pencil on paper		Aichi Prefectural Museum of Art			15.5 centimetres (6.1 in) by 10.2 centimetres (4.0 in)	Figure	

== See also ==
- Kuroda Seiki
- Aoki Shigeru
- Yōga
- Nihonga
- Japanese painting
