= Japon Louvre Sculpture Museum =

Japanese museum

- ルーブル彫刻美術館
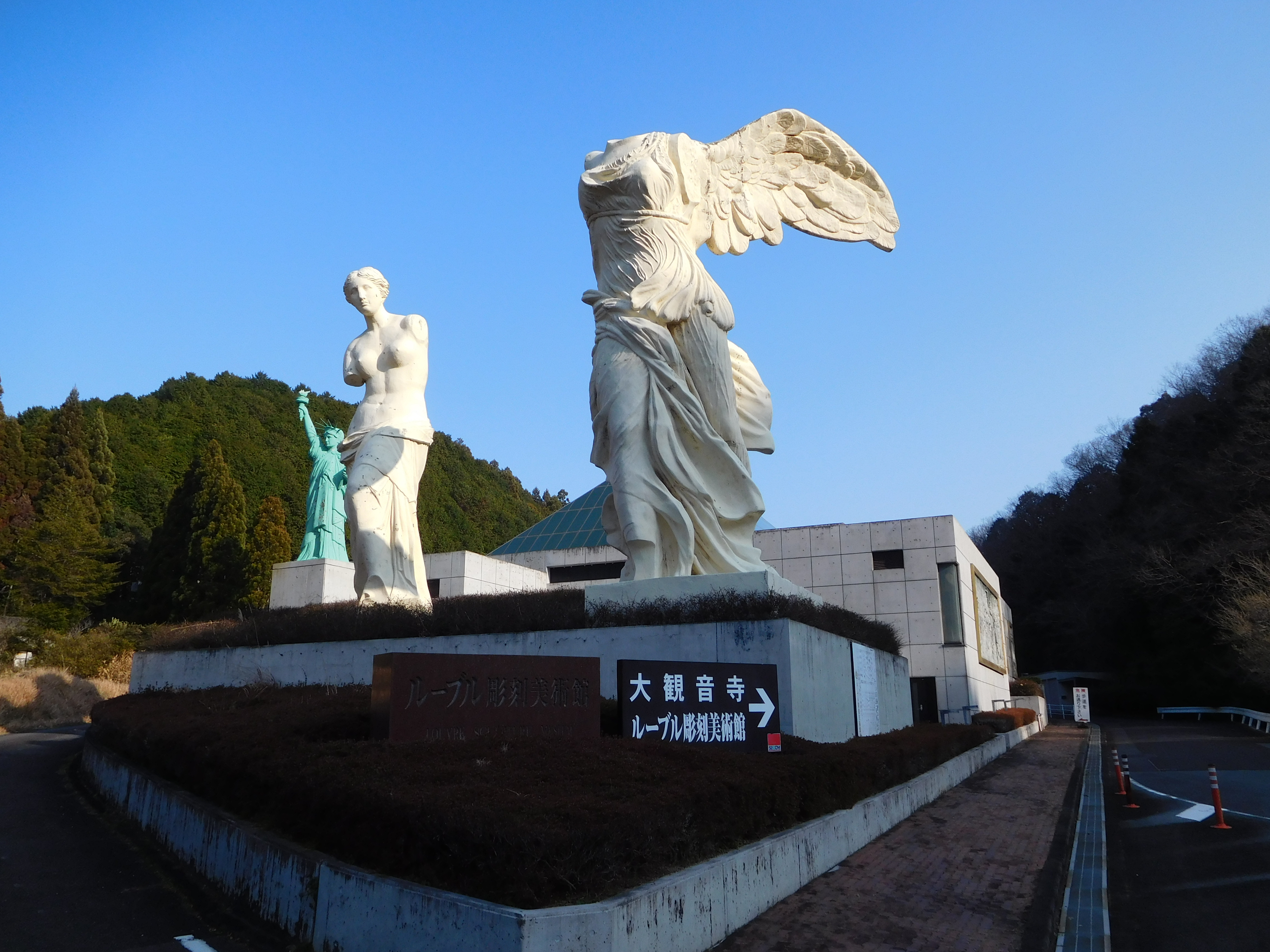
- Interactive map of the Japon Louvre Sculpture Museum area

General information
- Location: 1957 Sada Higashidani, Hakusan-chō, Tsu, Mie Prefecture, Japan
- Coordinates: 34°40′35″N 136°20′57″E
- Opened: 16 December 1987

Website
- www.louvre-m.com

Japon Louvre Sculpture Museum (ルーブル彫刻美術館, Rūburu Chōkoku Bijutsukan) opened in Tsu, Mie Prefecture, Japan in 1987. The collection comprises some 1,300 replicas of famous statues from the Louvre—as agreed with then director Hubert Landais—and other collections, and includes those of the Venus de Milo, Winged Victory of Samothrace, Apollo Belvedere, Townley Discobolus, and Bust of Nefertiti, as well as of Michelangelo's Moses. The museum is managed and operated by the local Shingon temple of Daikannon-ji (大観音寺), which was established in 1982.

== See also ==
- Mie Prefectural Museum
- Mie Prefectural Art Museum
- Sekisui Museum
- Ise Grand Shrine
