= Nagashima Museum =

Museum in Kagoshima Prefecture, Japan

- 長島美術館
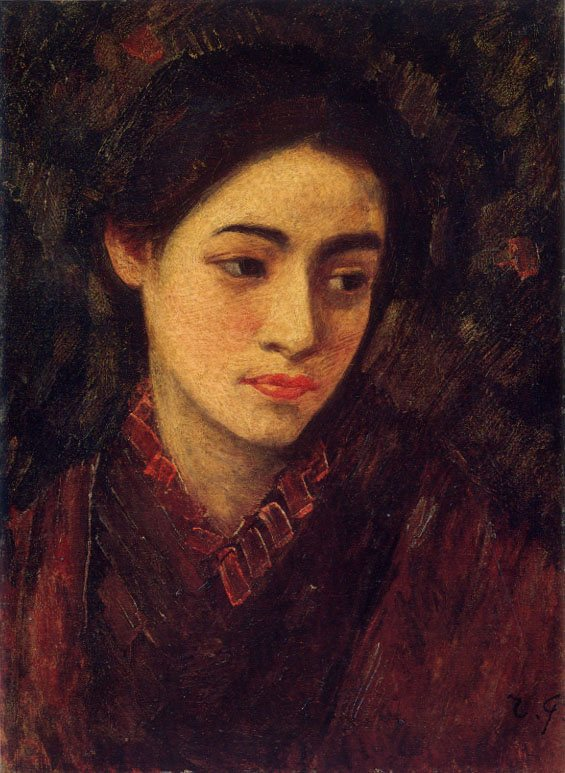
- Portrait of a Woman by Fujishima Takeji
- Interactive map of the Nagashima Museum area

General information
- Location: 3-42-18 Take, Kagoshima, Kagoshima Prefecture, Japan
- Coordinates: 31°34′54″N 130°31′57″E
- Opened: October 1989

Website
- Official website

Nagashima Museum (長島美術館, Nagashima bijutsukan) opened in Kagoshima, Kagoshima Prefecture, Japan, in 1989, the centenary of the city's official foundation. Located on a hill overlooking Sakurajima and Kagoshima Bay, at an elevation of 110 metres, the museum's collection of some thousand objects amassed by businessman Nagashima Kōsuke (長島公佑), includes works by Kuroda Seiki, Rodin, and Chagall, as well as Satsuma ware.

== See also ==
- Kagoshima City Museum of Art
- Reimeikan, Kagoshima Prefectural Center for Historical Material
- List of Cultural Properties of Japan - paintings (Kagoshima)
