= Bonotsu History Museum Kishinkan =

- 坊津歴史資料センター輝津館
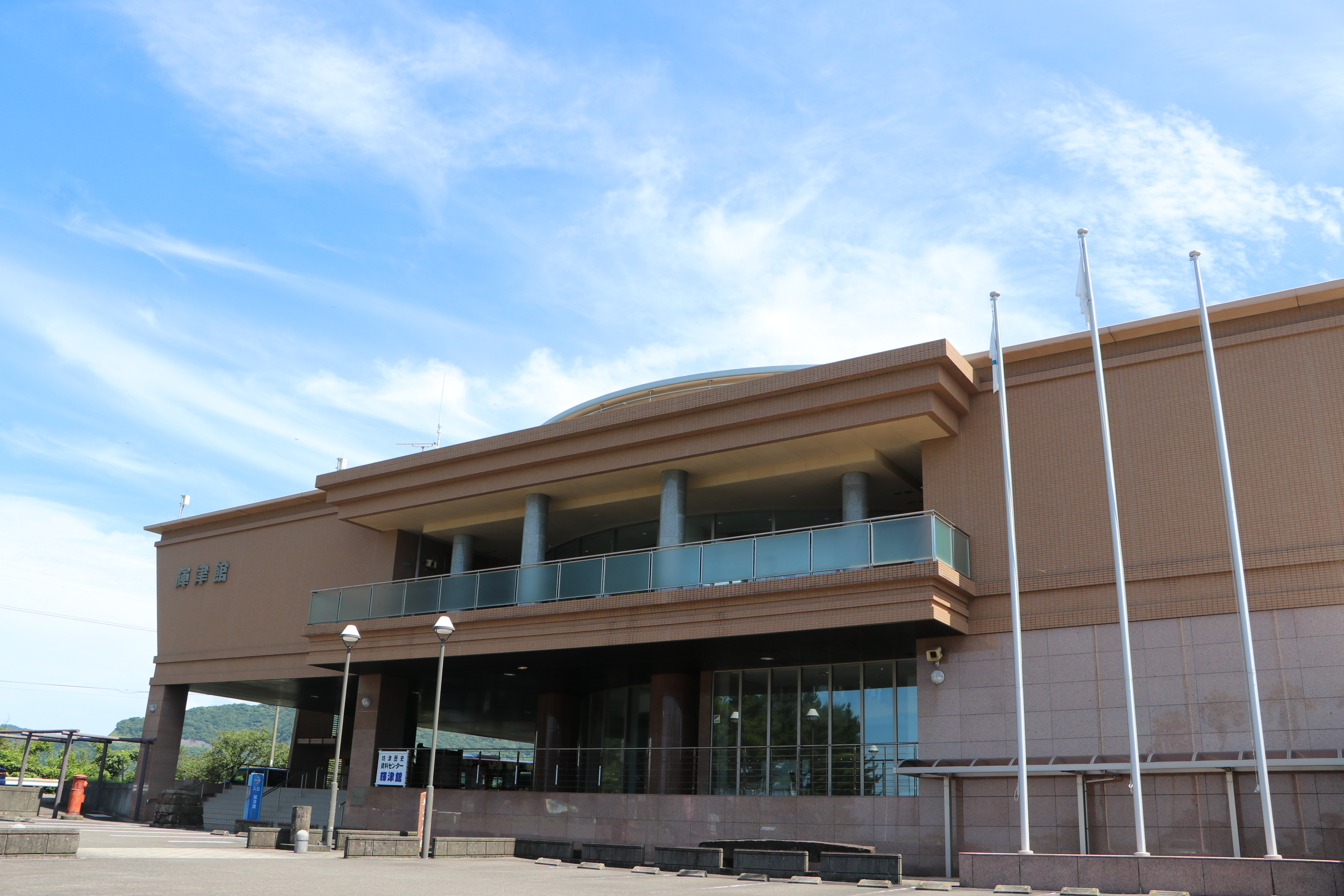
- Interactive map of the Bonotsu History Museum Kishinkan area

General information
- Location: 9424-1 Bōnotsu-chōbō, Minamisatsuma, Kagoshima Prefecture, Japan
- Coordinates: 31°16′25″N 130°13′29″E
- Opened: 3 March 2004

Bonotsu History Museum Kishinkan (坊津歴史資料センター輝津館, Bōnotsu Rekishi Shiryō Sentā Kishinkan) opened in Minamisatsuma, Kagoshima Prefecture, Japan, in 2004. The collection includes the Important Cultural Property Eight Aspects of the Buddha's Parinirvana.

== See also ==
- Reimeikan, Kagoshima Prefectural Center for Historical Material
- List of Historic Sites of Japan (Kagoshima)
- List of Cultural Properties of Japan - paintings (Kagoshima)
- List of Cultural Properties of Japan - historical materials (Kagoshima)
