= University Art Museum =

University Art Museum may refer to:

- University Art Museum (State University of New York at Albany)
- University Art Museum, Santa Barbara
- University Art Museum, CSULB at California State University, Long Beach
- Paul and Lulu Hilliard University Art Museum
- Princeton University Art Museum
- Indiana University Art Museum
- Arizona State University Art Museum
- Miami University Art Museum
- University of New Mexico Art Museum
- University Art Museum (Tokyo University of the Arts)

== See also ==
- University art museums and galleries
