= List of cultural properties of Japan – paintings (Kagoshima) =

This list is of the cultural properties of Japan designated in the category of paintings (絵画, kaiga) for the Prefecture of Kagoshima.

== National Cultural Properties ==
As of 1 July 2019, one Important Cultural Property has been designated, being of national significance.

Property	Date	Municipality	Ownership	Comments	Image	Dimensions	Coordinates	Ref.
Eight Aspects of the Buddha's Parinirvana, colours on silk 絹本著色八相涅槃図 kenpon chakushoku hassō nehan zu	Kamakura period	Minamisatsuma	Ryūgan-ji (龍巌寺) (kept at Kishinkan, Bōnotsu Center for Historical Material)	the other seven major events in Shaka's life are depicted around the central scene		2.9 metres (9 ft 6 in) by 2.64 metres (8 ft 8 in)	31°16′09″N 130°13′49″E	

== Prefectural Cultural Properties ==
As of 14 August 2018, six properties have been designated at a prefectural level.

Property	Date	Municipality	Ownership	Comments	Image	Dimensions	Coordinates	Ref.
Sixteen Arhats 十六羅漢 十六幅 jūroku Rakan jūroku haba	1854	Shibushi	Daiji-ji (大慈寺))	on paper; sixteen scrolls; by Tokuan (徳庵)		135 centimetres (4 ft 5 in) by 44.4 centimetres (1 ft 5.5 in)	31°28′36″N 131°05′55″E	
Cedar doors 杉戸 sugi-to	Momoyama period	Minamisatsuma	private (kept at Kishinkan, Bōnotsu Center for Historical Material)	painted on both sides with subjects including Xiwangmu, the baku, a hawk on a rock, the morning sun, and bamboo in the snow; the right side of the face of Xi Wangmu was damaged by a machine gun bullet on 29 July 1945		178 centimetres (5 ft 10 in) by 96.5 centimetres (3 ft 2.0 in)	31°16′09″N 130°13′49″E	
Eight Aspects of Shaka 釈迦八相之図; Shaka hassō no zu	Edo period	Kagoshima	Kagoshima Prefecture (kept at Reimeikan, Kagoshima Prefectural Center for Historical Material)	thirteen scrolls on silk, with gold paint; thought to be from early Ming China; restored three times since 1708; dedicated by Shimazu Yoshihisa; recorded as "Paintings of Eight Aspects of Shaka in thirteen scrolls, by a celebrated Chinese master" (「釈迦八相画十三幅, 唐人名筆」) in Sankoku meisho zue (三国名勝図会)		132.0 centimetres (4 ft 4.0 in) by 65.5 centimetres (2 ft 1.8 in)	31°35′55″N 130°33′17″E	
Mount Fuji and Clouds 富嶽雲烟之図 一幅; Fugaku unen no zu ippuku	1753	Kagoshima	Kagoshima City (kept at the Kagoshima City Museum of Art)	ink on paper; by Kimura Tangen (木村探元) (1679-1767)		237 centimetres (7 ft 9 in) by 128 centimetres (4 ft 2 in)	31°35′45″N 130°33′12″E	
Warrior (by tradition, Shimazu Tadahisa) 武将像(伝島津忠久画像)一幅 bushō zō (den-Shimazu Tadahisa gazō) ippuku	end of the Kamakura period/Nanboku-chō period	Kagoshima	Shoko Shuseikan (尚古集成館)	colour on silk; from Kōzan-ji		87.4 centimetres (2 ft 10.4 in) by 26.8 centimetres (10.6 in)	31°37′02″N 130°34′34″E	
Unzan, colour on silk 絹本著色雲山和尚像 一幅 kenpon chakushoku Unzan oshō zō ippuku	1490s	Izumi	Kannō-ji (感応寺)	portrait of Unzan (1274-1344), a priest from Tōfuku-ji who, at the invitation of Shimazu Sadahisa (島津貞久), oversaw the revival of the Shimazu clan family temple of Kannō-ji, where he served as chief priest from 1323-1344, garnering praise also from Ashikaga Takauji, as celebrated in the waka above his portrait, the oldest of a Zen priest in the prefecture		95.5 centimetres (3 ft 1.6 in) by 45 centimetres (1 ft 6 in)	32°04′02″N 130°16′00″E	

== Municipal Cultural Properties ==
As of 14 August 2018, twenty-nine properties have been designated at a municipal level, including:

Property	Date	Municipality	Ownership	Comments	Image	Dimensions	Coordinates	Ref.
The Artist's Studio, by Kuroda Seiki 黒田清輝作「アトリエ」 Kuroda Seiki-saku atorie	1890	Kagoshima	Kagoshima City (kept at Kagoshima City Museum of Art)	oil on canvas; the atelier of Raphaël Collin, Kuroda Seiki's teacher at the Académie Colarossi in Paris		72.8 centimetres (28.7 in) by 60.6 centimetres (23.9 in)	31°35′45″N 130°33′12″E	for all refs see
Six Episodes from the Eruption of Sakurajima, by Kuroda Seiki 黒田清輝作「桜島噴火連作6点」 Kuroda Seiki-saku Sakurajima funka rensaku 6-ten	1914	Kagoshima	Kagoshima City (kept at Kagoshima City Museum of Art)	in Kagoshima from 8 January 1914 due to his father's illness, Kuroda Seiki witnessed a major eruption of Sakurajima and created, in oil on wooden panels, a series of six paintings showing the Plume of smoke (噴煙), Eruption (噴火), Lava (溶岩), Ash fall (降灰), Devastation (荒廃), and Steam (湯気)		14 centimetres (5.5 in) by 18 centimetres (7.1 in)	31°35′45″N 130°33′12″E	
Bamboo, by Hatta Tomonori 八田知紀筆「竹」 Hatta Tomonori hitsu take	C19	Kagoshima	Kagoshima City (kept at Kagoshima City Museum of Art)			155.3 centimetres (61.1 in) by 152.5 centimetres (60.0 in)	31°35′45″N 130°33′12″E	
Study of a Nude, by Fujishima Takeji 裸体習作 藤島武二 ratai shūsaku Fujishima Takeji	1906/7	Kagoshima	Kagoshima City (kept at Kagoshima City Museum of Art)	oil on canvas; from Fujishima Takeji's study days in France			31°35′45″N 130°33′12″E	
Chinese Landscape, by Fujishima Takeji 藤島武二作「中国風景」 Fujishima Takeji-saku Chūgoku fūkei	1938	Kagoshima	Kagoshima City (kept at Kagoshima City Museum of Art)	oil on canvas; Fujishima Takeji travelled to China in 1937 to serve as judge for the inaugural Manchuria Fine Arts Exhibition (満州美術展) (Manten); the following year his travels took him to Mongolia, Chengde, and Peking			31°35′45″N 130°33′12″E	
Red Matches, by Wada Eisaku 和田英作作「赤い燐寸」 Wada Eisaku-saku akai matchi	1914	Kagoshima	Kagoshima City (kept at Kagoshima City Museum of Art)	oil on canvas; entered in the eighth Bunten exhibition in 1914; Wada Eisaku's friend Shibusawa Hideo (澁沢秀雄), at the time a student at Tokyo Imperial University, served as model during a trip to Toi on the Izu Peninsula			31°35′45″N 130°33′12″E	
Suzanna, by Arishima Ikuma 有島生馬作「スザンナ」 Arishima Ikuma-saku Suzanna	1909	Kagoshima	Kagoshima City (kept at Kagoshima City Museum of Art)			35 centimetres (14 in) by 27 centimetres (11 in)	31°35′45″N 130°33′12″E	
Parisian daughter, by Arishima Ikuma 有島生馬作「巴里娘」 Arishima Ikuma-saku Pari musume	1964	Kagoshima	Kagoshima City (kept at Kagoshima City Museum of Art)				31°35′45″N 130°33′12″E	
Court ladies, emakimono, by Momota Ryūei 桃田柳栄筆 「官女図巻」一巻; Momota Ryūei hitsu kannyo zu kan ichi-kan	Edo period	Kagoshima	Kagoshima City (kept at Kagoshima City Museum of Art)				31°35′45″N 130°33′12″E	

== See also ==
- Cultural Properties of Japan
- List of National Treasures of Japan (paintings)
- Japanese painting
- List of Cultural Properties of Japan - historical materials (Kagoshima)
- List of Historic Sites of Japan (Kagoshima)
- List of Museums in Kagoshima Prefecture
