= List of cultural properties of Japan – historical materials (Kagoshima) =

This list is of the cultural properties of Japan designated in the category of historical materials (歴史資料, rekishi shiryō) for the Prefecture of Kagoshima.

== National Cultural Properties ==
As of 1 August 2015, six Important Cultural Properties have been designated, being of national significance.

Property	Date	Municipality	Ownership	Comments	Image	Coordinates	Ref.
Daguerreotype of Shimazu Nariakira 銀板写真（島津斉彬像） ginban shashin (Shimazu Nariakira zō)	1857	Kagoshima	Shōko Shūseikan (尚古集成館)			31°37′02″N 130°34′35″E	
Shaper 形削盤〈／一八六三年、オランダ製〉 keisaku ban	1863	Kagoshima	Shōko Shūseikan (尚古集成館)	manufactured in the Netherlands		31°37′02″N 130°34′35″E	
Materials relating to the Ōteki Family of shipwrights 船大工樗木家関係資料 funadaiku Ōteki-ke kankei shiryō	Edo period	Satsumasendai	Sendai Historical Museum (薩摩川内市川内歴史資料館)	575 items		31°49′58″N 130°18′30″E	
Materials relating to Ōkubo Toshimichi 大久保利通関係資料; Ōkubo Toshimichi kankei shiryō	late Edo to Meiji period	Kagoshima	Reimeikan, Kagoshima Prefectural Center for Historical Material	1,650 items		31°35′55″N 130°33′17″E	
Bunroku 3 Shimazu clan Taikō survey shaku (with the seal of Ishida Mitsunari) 文禄三年島津氏分国太閤検地尺〈石田三成署判／〉 Buroku sannen Shimazu-shi bunkoku taikō kenchi jaku (Ishida Mitsunari shohan)	1594	Kagoshima	Shōko Shūseikan (尚古集成館)			31°37′02″N 130°34′35″E	
Materials relating to Kimura Kahei 木村嘉平関係資料; Kimura Kahei kankei shiryō	Edo period	Kagoshima	Shōko Shūseikan (尚古集成館)	8,336 items		31°37′02″N 130°34′35″E	

== Prefectural Cultural Properties ==
As of 1 April 2015, five properties have been designated at a prefectural level.

Property	Date	Municipality	Ownership	Comments	Image	Coordinates	Ref.
Flag of Shimazu Takahisa and sixteen others 島津貴久所用時雨の旗一旒ほか十六旒; Shimazu Takahisa shoyō shigure no hata ichiryū hoka jūrokuryū	Muromachi to Meiji period	Kagoshima	Shōko Shūseikan (尚古集成館)			31°37′02″N 130°34′35″E	
Materials relating to inuōmono 犬追物関係資料 inuōmono kankei shiryō	Muromachi to Edo period	Kagoshima	Shōko Shūseikan (尚古集成館)	55 costumes and tools, 1 box, 18 hanging scrolls, 9 photos, along with 201 scrolls, 288 books, 96 sheets, and 4 bundles of documents		31°37′02″N 130°34′35″E	
Ōnejime-chō Tenjinshimo Kasatōba 大根占町天神下の笠塔婆; Ōnejime-chō Tenjinshimo no kasatōba	1267	Kinkō	private			31°14′47″N 130°47′28″E	
Anglo-Satsuma War emaki 英艦入港戦争図 一薩英戦争絵巻一; Eikan nyūkō sensō zu (Satsu-Ei sensō emaki)	1860s	Kagoshima	Shōko Shūseikan (尚古集成館)	pair of scrolls		31°37′02″N 130°34′35″E	
Wooden board inscribed in ink with the word "shōchū" at Kōriyama Hachiman Jinja 郡山八幡社所蔵の「焼酎」文字記載墨書木片; Kōriyama Hachiman Jinja shozō no "shōchū" moji kisai bokusho mokuhen	1559	Isa	Kōriyama Hachiman Jinja (郡山八幡神社)	the oldest known reference to shōchū, signed by two craftsmen and dated the eleventh day of the eighth month of Eiroku 2: "the high priest was so stingy he never once gave us shōchū to drink - what a nuisance!" (其時座主ハ大キナこすてをちやりて一度も焼酎ヲ不被下候何共めいわくな事哉)		32°04′58″N 130°35′53″E	

== Municipal Cultural Properties ==
As of 1 April 2015, one hundred and forty-six properties have been designated at a prefectural level.

== See also ==
- Cultural Properties of Japan
- List of Historic Sites of Japan (Kagoshima)
- Ōsumi Province, Satsuma Province
- List of National Treasures of Japan (historical materials)
