= Seki Art Gallery =

- セキ美術館
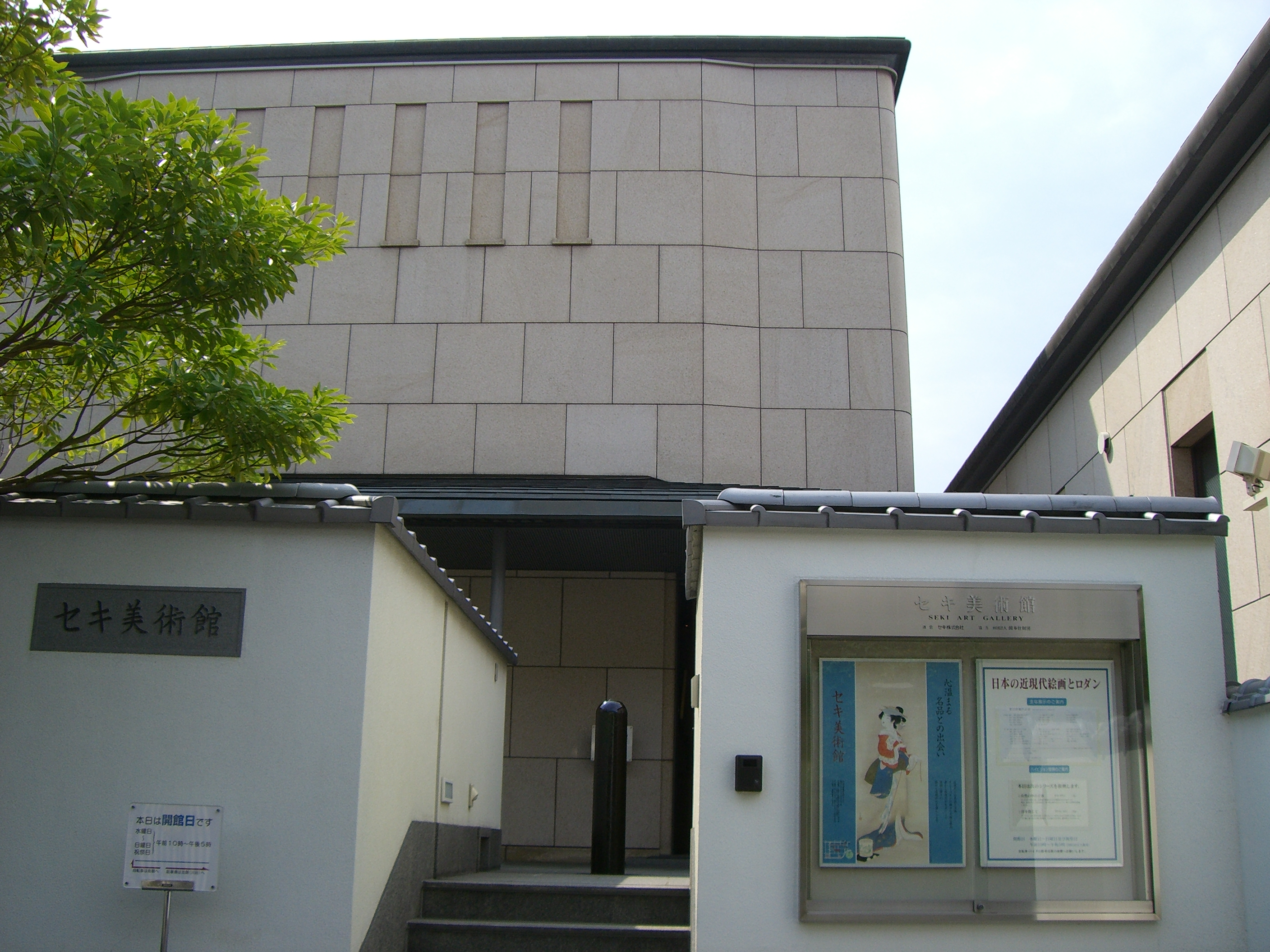
- Interactive map of the Seki Art Gallery area

General information
- Location: 4-42 Dōgokita-machi, Matsuyama, Ehime Prefecture, Japan
- Coordinates: 33°51′03″N 132°46′54″E
- Opened: 1997

Website
- Official website (ja)

Seki Art Gallery (セキ美術館, Seki Bijutsukan) is a private art museum that opened in Matsuyama, Ehime Prefecture, Japan in 1997. The collection includes sculptures by Rodin and Bourdelle, Yōga by Asai Chū, Fujishima Takeji, and Koiso Ryōhei, and Nihonga by Yokoyama Taikan and Kayama Matazō.

== See also ==
- The Museum of Art, Ehime
- Dōgo Onsen
- Ishite-ji
