= Okawa Museum of Art =

Art museum in Gunma, Japan

Ōkawa Museum of Art
- 大川美術館
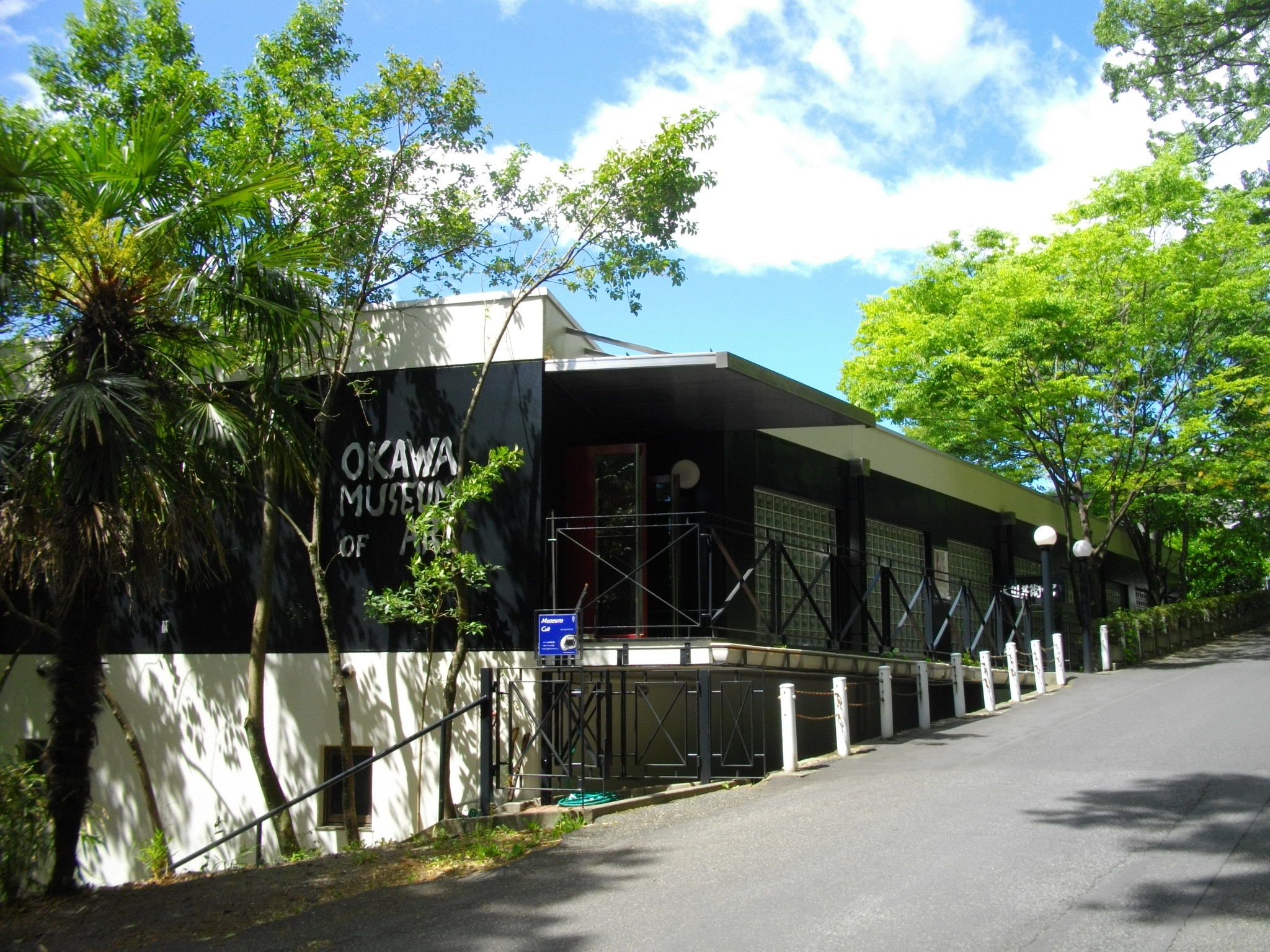
- Interactive map of the Ōkawa Museum of Art area

General information
- Location: 3-36 Kosone-cho, Kiryū, Gunma Prefecture, Japan
- Coordinates: 36°25′0.6″N 139°20′2.4″E
- Opened: April 1989

Technical details
- Floor count: 3 above ground

Website
- okawamuseum.jp

The Okawa Museum of Art (大川美術館, Ōkawa Bijutsukan) is an art gallery in Kiryū, Gunma Prefecture, Japan that concentrates on modern Japanese art.

== History ==
The gallery was opened in April 1989, presents the collection of the businessman and writer Eiji Ōkawa (大川栄ニ, 1924–2008), who was born in Kiryū.

== Collection ==
The museum has about 6500 items. At its core are about eighty works by Shunsuke Matsumoto (松本竣介) and Hideo Noda (野田英夫); there are many works by other artists associated with these two. The gallery also has a hundred sketches by Takeji Fujishima (藤島武二) and two hundred drawings by Toshi Shimizu (清水登之).

== Exhibitions ==
While the majority of the museum’s holdings are from Japanese artists, exhibitions held at the museum are not limited to Japanese art. For example, in early 1990 it held an exhibition of Ben Shahn.
