= Kasama Nichidō Museum of Art =

- 笠間日動美術館
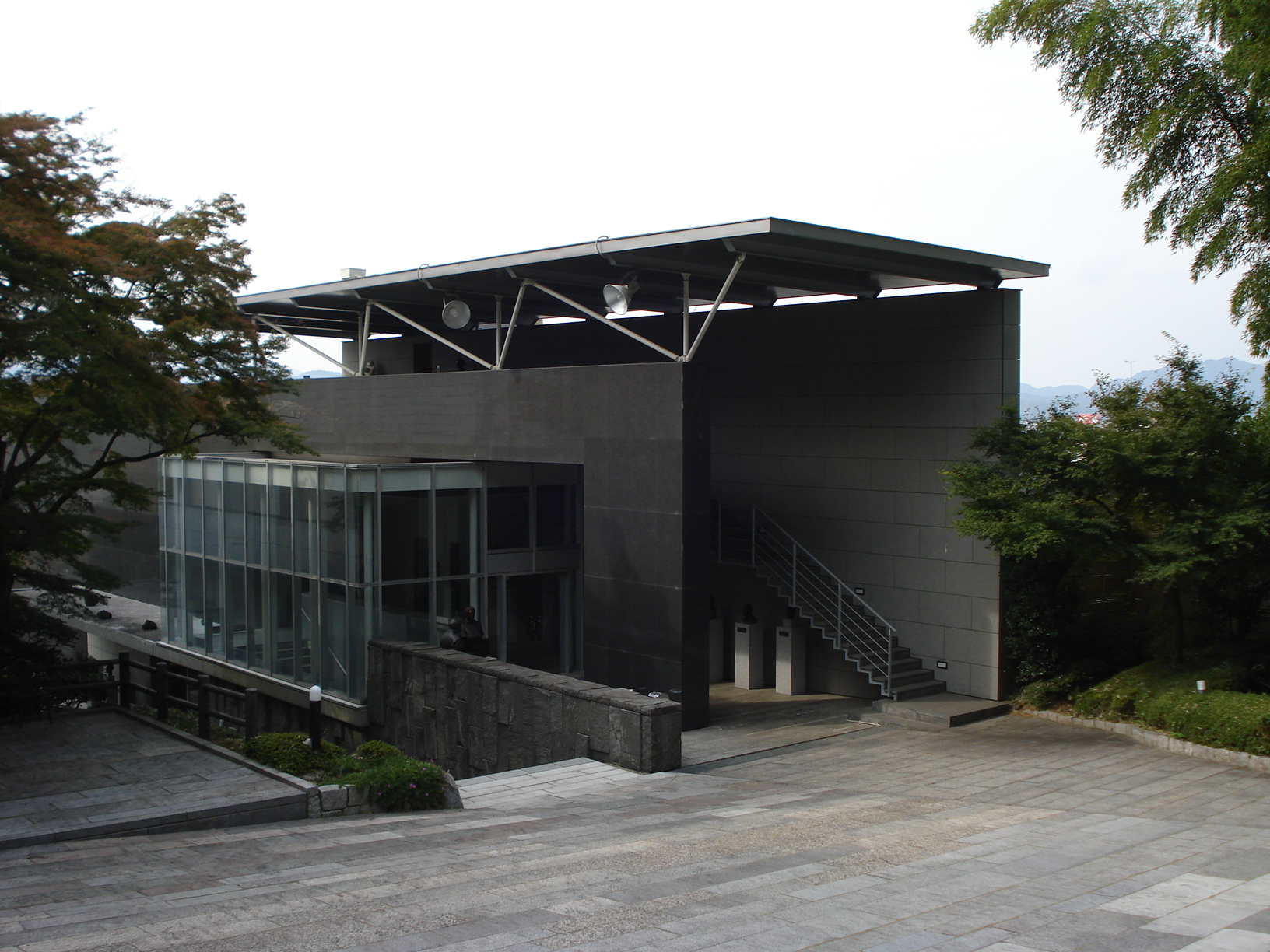
- Interactive map of the Kasama Nichidō Museum of Art area

General information
- Location: 978-4 Kasama, Kasama, Ibaraki Prefecture, Japan
- Coordinates: 36°23′04″N 140°15′30″E
- Opened: 11 November 1972

Website
- Official website

Kasama Nichidō Museum of Art (笠間日動美術館, Kasama Nichidō Bijutsukan) opened in Kasama, Ibaraki Prefecture, Japan, in 1972. It was established to celebrate the forty-fifth anniversary of the opening of the Galerie Nichidō (日動画廊), the first commercial art gallery in Japan specialising in yōga or Western-style painting.

== See also ==
- The Museum of Modern Art, Ibaraki
