= Sekisui Museum =

Museum in Tsu, Mie Prefecture, Japan

- 石水博物館
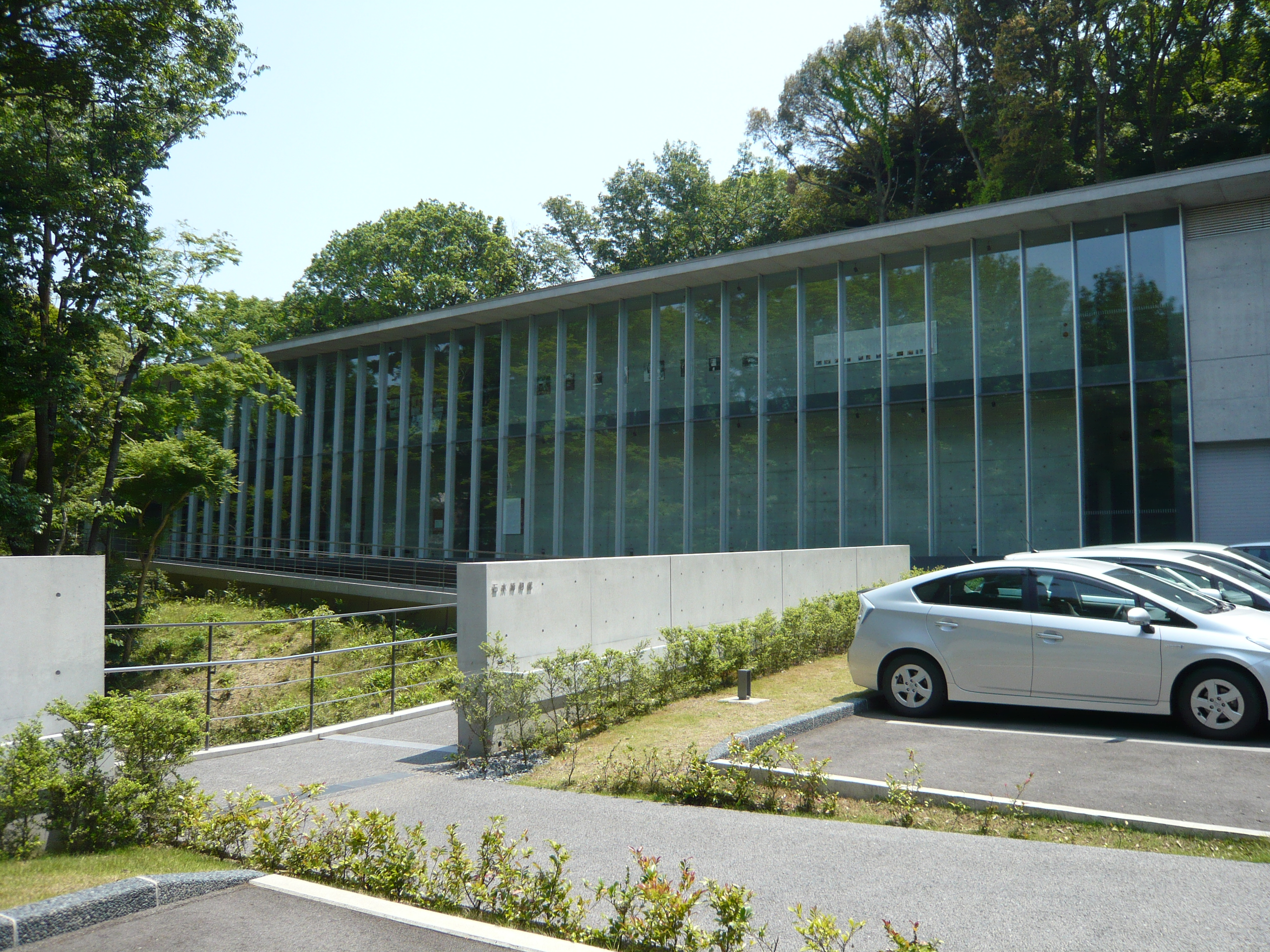
- Interactive map of the Sekisui Museum area

General information
- Location: 3032-18 Tarumi, Tsu, Mie Prefecture, Japan
- Coordinates: 34°41′53″N 136°30′17″E
- Opened: 1930
- Renovated: May 2011

Website
- Official website

Sekisui Museum (石水博物館, Sekisui Hakubutsukan) is a registered museum in Tsu, Mie Prefecture, Japan. First established as Sekisui Kaikan (石水会館) in 1930, the museum was registered in accordance with the Museum Act in 1975, reorganized as a "public interest incorporated foundation" under its present name in 2010, and in the following year relocated from Marunouchi to Tarumi (both in Tsu), reopening in new premises nestled in a wooded area of Mount Chitose in May 2011. The collection includes tea utensils, paintings, books, historical materials relating to the merchants of Ise Province, and items relating to potter and founder Kawakita Handeishi (川喜田半泥子) (1878–1963).

== See also ==
- Mie Prefectural Museum
- Ise Jingū
