= Kurume City Art Museum =

Museum in Kurume, Fukuoka Prefecture, Japan

Kariya City Art Museum
- 久留米市美術館
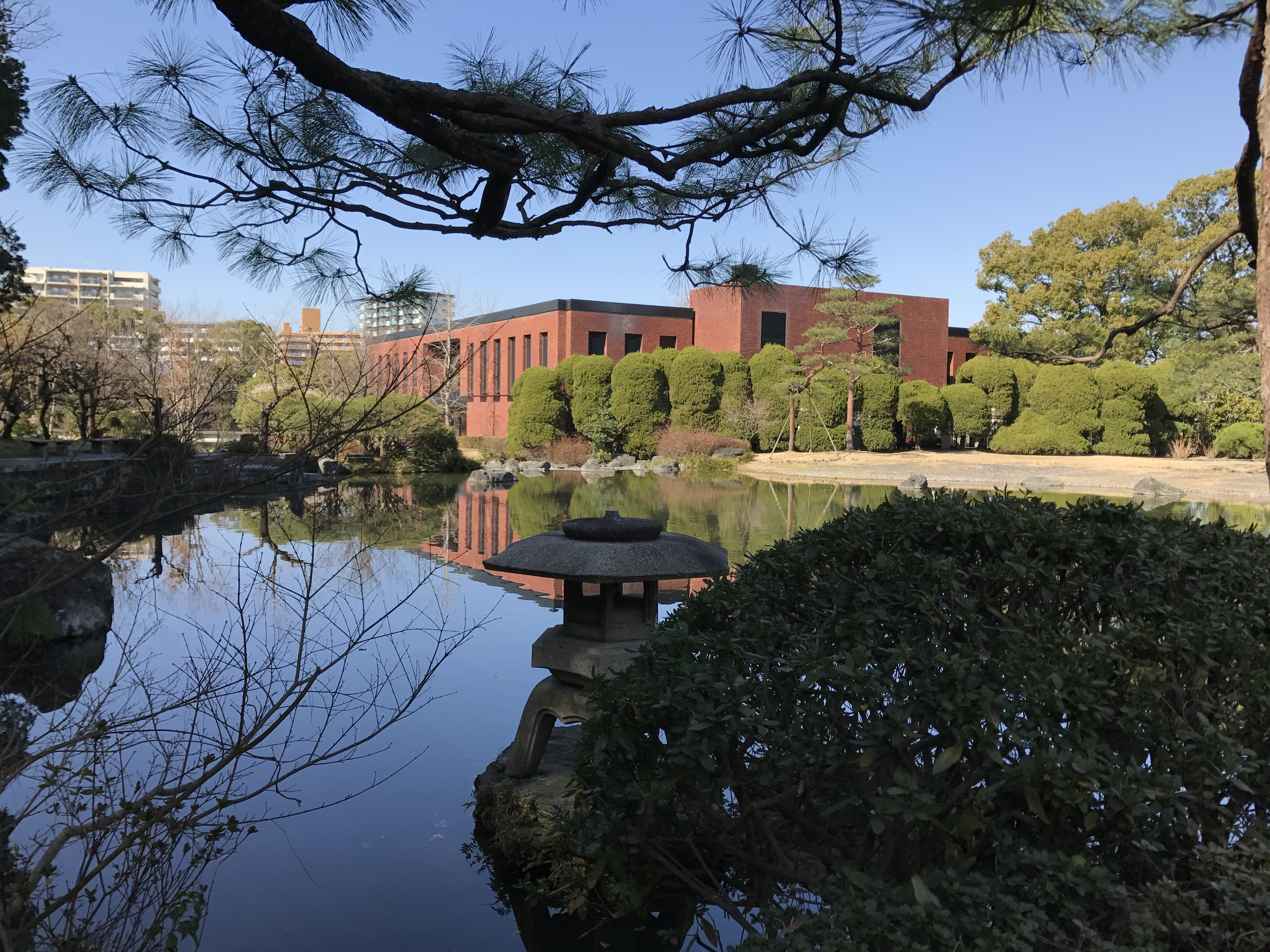
- Interactive map of the Kariya City Art Museum area

General information
- Location: 1015, Nonaka-machi, Kurume, Fukuoka Prefecture, Japan
- Coordinates: 33°18′43″N 130°31′49″E
- Opened: 19 November 2016

Website
- Official website

Kurume City Art Museum (久留米市美術館, Kurume-shi Bijutsukan) opened as the successor to the Ishibashi Museum of Art in Kurume, Fukuoka Prefecture, Japan in 2016. It forms part of the Ishibashi Culture Center, which opened in 1956, alongside the studio of yōga painter Sakamoto Hanjirō (坂本繁二郎), relocated from Yame in 1980, and Shōjirō Ishibashi Memorial Museum, dedicated to the founder of Bridgestone and donated to the city by the Ishibashi Foundation after renovation in 2016, on the sixtieth anniversary of the Ishibashi Culture Center's opening. The focus of the collection is the work of local artists, notably Kurume scions Aoki Shigeru and Sakamoto Hanjirō, as well as Kyūshū yōga more generally.

== See also ==
- List of Cultural Properties of Japan - paintings (Fukuoka)
- List of Historic Sites of Japan (Fukuoka)
- Kyushu National Museum
- Artizon Museum
