= Kosugi Hōan Museum of Art, Nikkō =

Museum in Nikkō, Tochigi, Japan

- 小杉放菴記念日光美術館
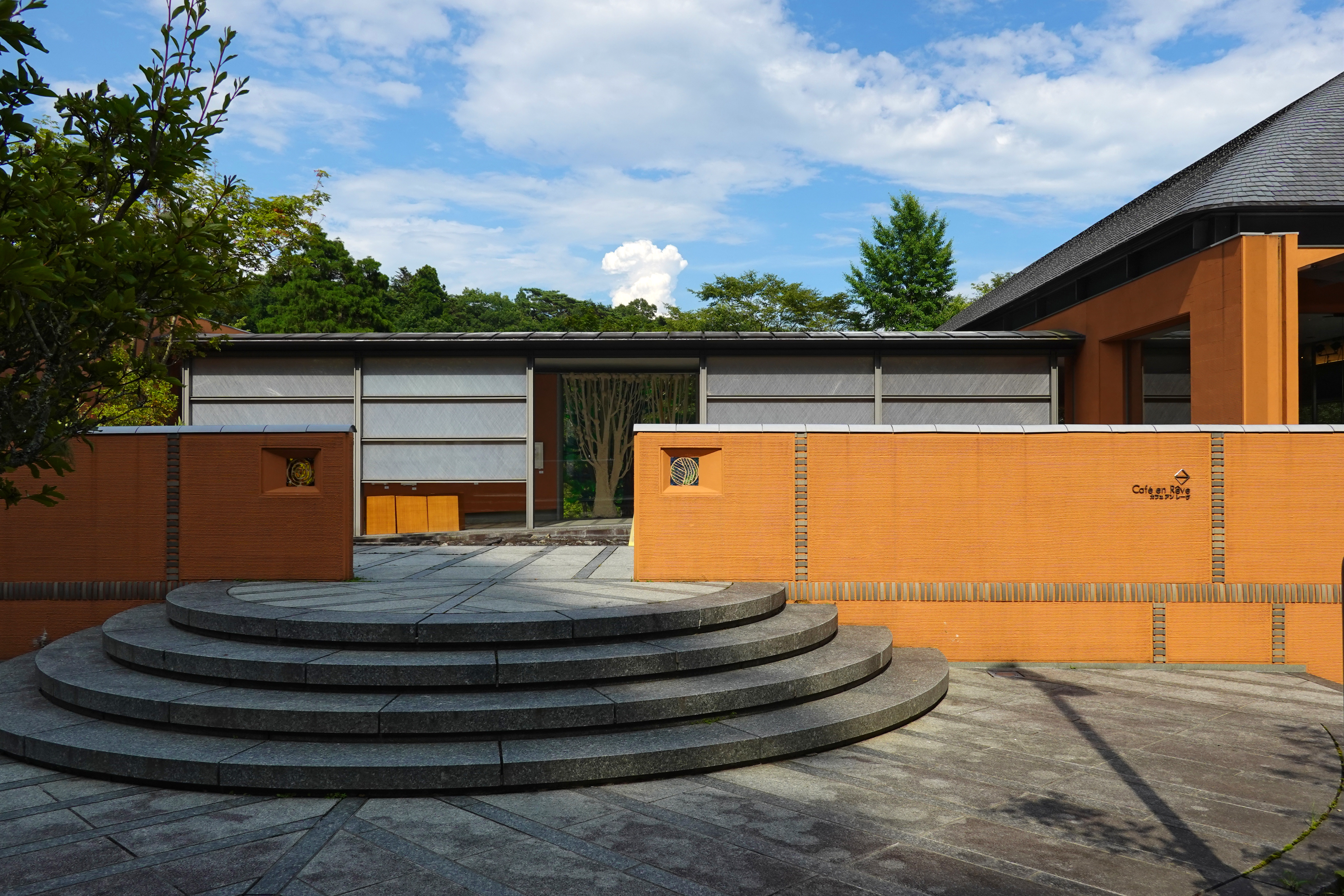
- Interactive map of the Kosugi Hōan Museum of Art, Nikkō area

General information
- Location: 2388-3 Sannai,, Nikkō, Tochigi Prefecture, Japan
- Coordinates: 36°45′17″N 139°36′19″E
- Opened: 8 October 1997

Website
- Official website

Kosugi Hōan Museum of Art, Nikkō (小杉放菴記念日光美術館, Kosugi Hōan Kinen Nikkō Bijutsukan) opened in Nikkō, Tochigi Prefecture, Japan in 1997. Named after and exhibiting works by artist Kosugi Hōan, the museum's collection and displays document the area's natural beauty as well as its cultural presence.

== See also ==
- Tochigi Prefectural Museum of Fine Arts
- Nikkō National Park
- Nikkō Tōshō-gū
