= Kagoshima City Museum of Art =

- 鹿児島市立美術館
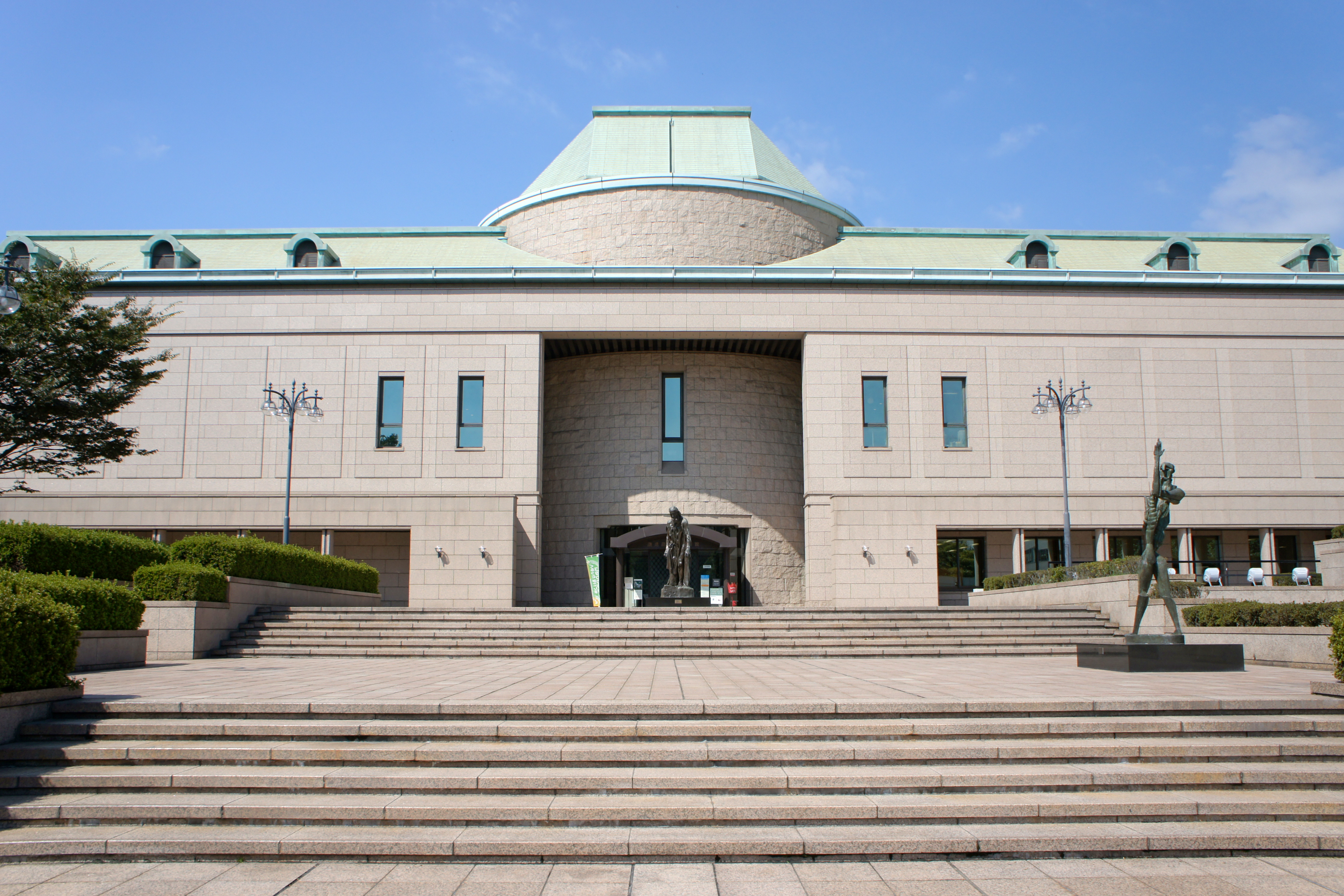
- Interactive map of the Kagoshima City Museum of Art area

General information
- Location: 4-36 Shiroyama-chō, Kagoshima, Kagoshima Prefecture, Japan
- Coordinates: 31°35′45″N 130°33′12″E
- Opened: 29 October 1985

Website
- Official website

Kagoshima City Museum of Art (鹿児島市立美術館, Kagoshima shiritsu bijutsukan) opened within the Ninomaru (secondary enclosure) of Tsurumaru Castle in Kagoshima, Kagoshima Prefecture, Japan, in 1985. The collection includes works by local artists Kuroda Seiki, Fujishima Takeji, and Wada Eisaku, as well as Western painters Claude Monet and Paul Cézanne.

== See also ==
- Reimeikan, Kagoshima Prefectural Center for Historical Material
- List of Cultural Properties of Japan - paintings (Kagoshima)
