= Portrait of a Man (Raphael) =

Painting by Raphael

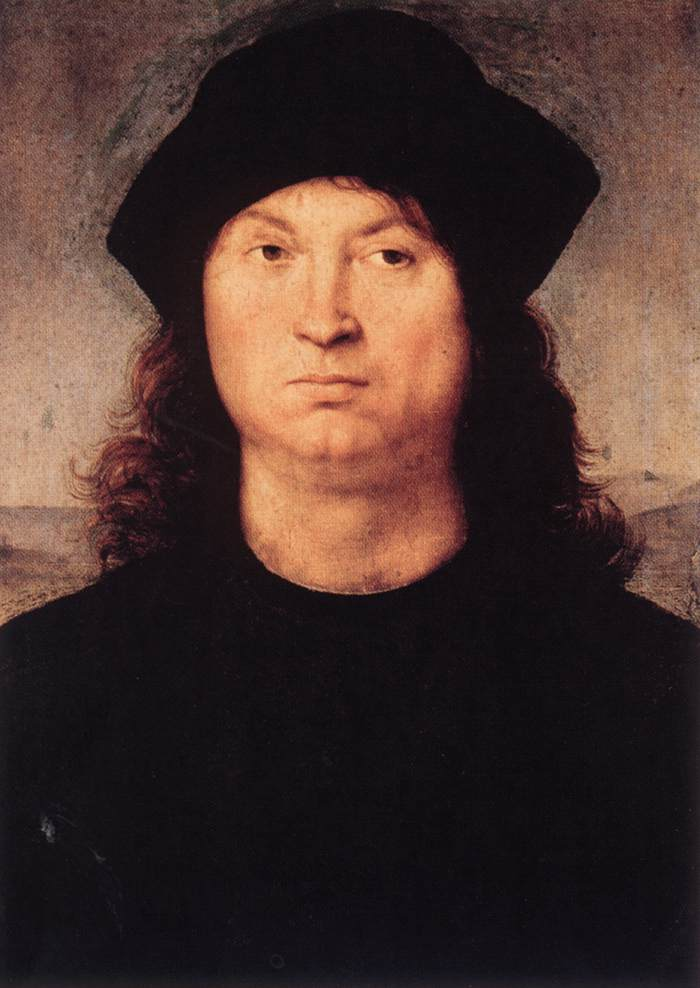
- Artist: Raphael
- Year: c. 1500-1504
- Medium: Oil on wood
- Dimensions: 45 cm × 31 cm (18 in × 12 in)
- Location: Galleria Borghese, Rome

The Portrait of a Man is an early work by the Italian Renaissance painter Raphael, executed c. 1500–1504. It has previously been attributed to Hans Holbein and Perugino. The portrait was restored in 1911. It is now in the Galleria Borghese, in Rome.

== See also ==
- List of paintings by Raphael
