= Shōko Shūseikan =

UNESCO World Heritage Site
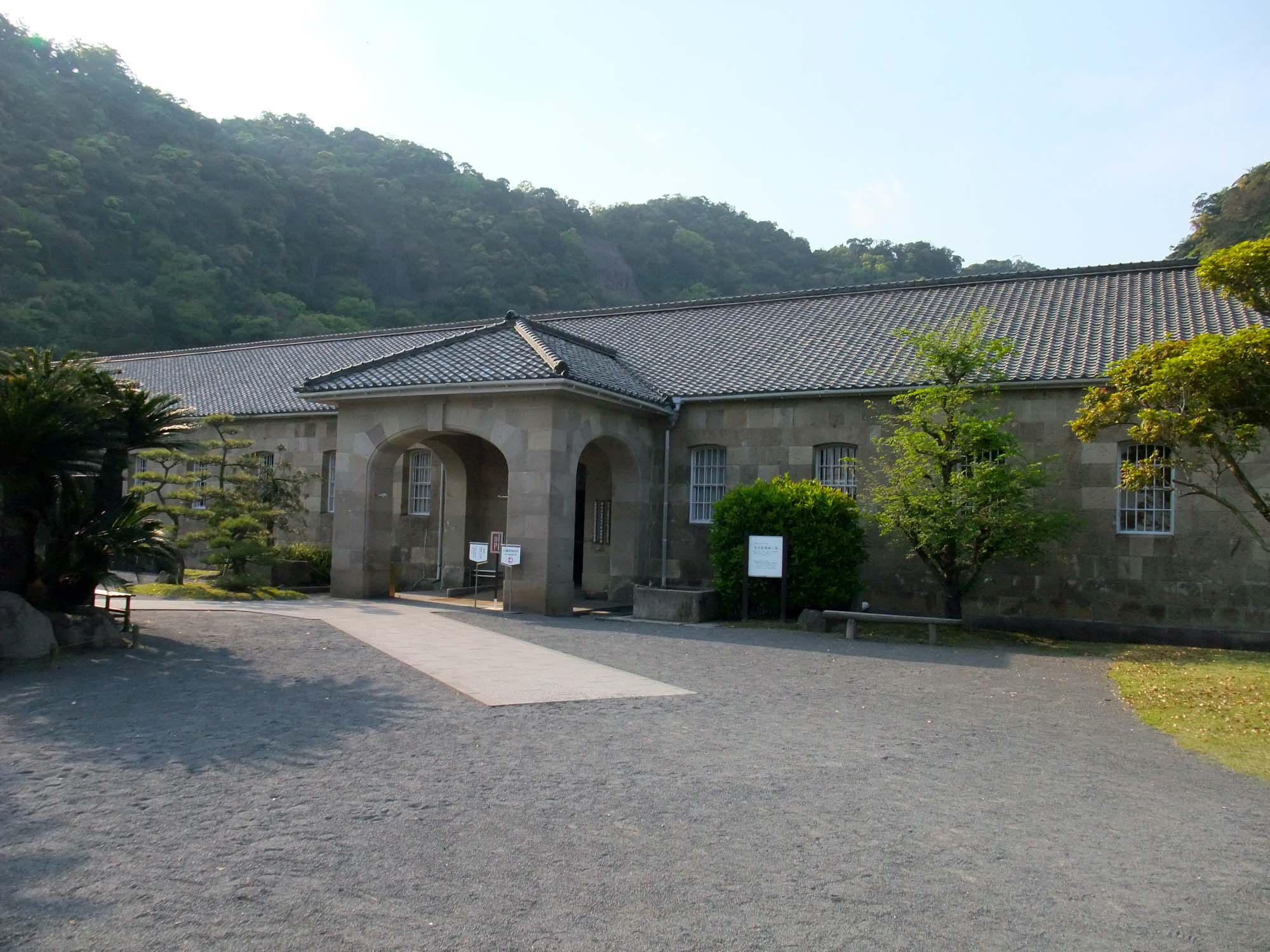
- Shūseikan

- Location within Kagoshima Prefecture Location within Japan
- Location: Kagoshima, Kagoshima, Japan
- Part of: Sites of Japan's Meiji Industrial Revolution: Iron and Steel, Shipbuilding and Coal Mining
- Criteria: Cultural: (ii), (iv)
- Reference: 1484
- Inscription: 2015 (39th Session)
- Coordinates: 31°37′02″N 130°34′35″E
- Important Cultural Property National Historic Site of Japan

Japan's Meiji Industrial Revolution sites map Kagoshima

The Shōko Shūseikan (尚古集成館, Shōko Shūseikan) is the site of a pre-modern industrial complex created in the Bakumatsu period by Satsuma Domain in the city of Kagoshima Japan. It was designed a National Historic Site, with the designation expanded in 2013. (ID1484-006) It was later designed as a component of the Sites of Japan's Meiji Industrial Revolution: Iron and Steel, Shipbuilding and Coal Mining, which received UNESCO World Heritage Site status in 2015.

== Overview ==
In the Bakumatsu period, the daimyō of Satsuma Domain, Shimazu Nariakira was greatly interested in Dutch studies and convinced of the need for Japan to industrialize and develop a military structure equipped with western armaments to avoid colonization by the Western powers. To this end, in 1852 he began construction of a reverberatory furnace for melting pig iron by clearing the bamboo forest at his residence in the outskirts of Kagoshima. This became the center for a group of factories which he collectively named "Shuseikan" in 1857. The facilities included a cannon foundry, a charcoal storehouse, a blast furnace, a machine shop, offices, a drilling factory for boring holes in cannon barrels, agricultural tools plant, a sugar mill, a pharmaceutical factory, a pot and kettle manufacturing plant, and a glass (Satsuma kiriko) manufacturing plant. There was also a factory to make land mines and torpedoes, and experiments were performed with the use of electricity and gas. Some 1,200 craftsmen worked at these factories every day, but after his death, operations were scaled back, and in 1863, almost everything except the reverberatory furnace was burned down during the Anglo-Satsuma War.

His successor, Shimazu Tadayoshi, who realized the superiority of the Western powers through this war, began to rebuild Shuseikan and constructed an even more extensive group of factories, with machinery imported from the United Kingdom, but after the abolition of the han system under the new Meiji government, the facilities were nationalized and became a cannon manufacturing plant for the Ministry and a shipyard for the Imperial Japanese Navy. During the Satsuma Rebellion in 1877, the buildings were occupied by students from private academies loyal to Saigo Takamori. They later became the property of the Shimazu clan again in 1889, but were closed in June 1915.

Of these factories, the building of the steam ironworks machine shop, completed in 1865, remains. It is a single-story stone building with a hipped roof, and is an extremely long and narrow building, approximately 42 bays wide at the front and 7 bays deep. The interior consists of two rooms, a spacious area and an area bordered by a partition. It is the first Western-style stone building in Japan to use arches, and was designated an Important Cultural Property in 1962. It is used as the Shoko Shuseikan Museum dedicated to the history of the Shimazu clan.

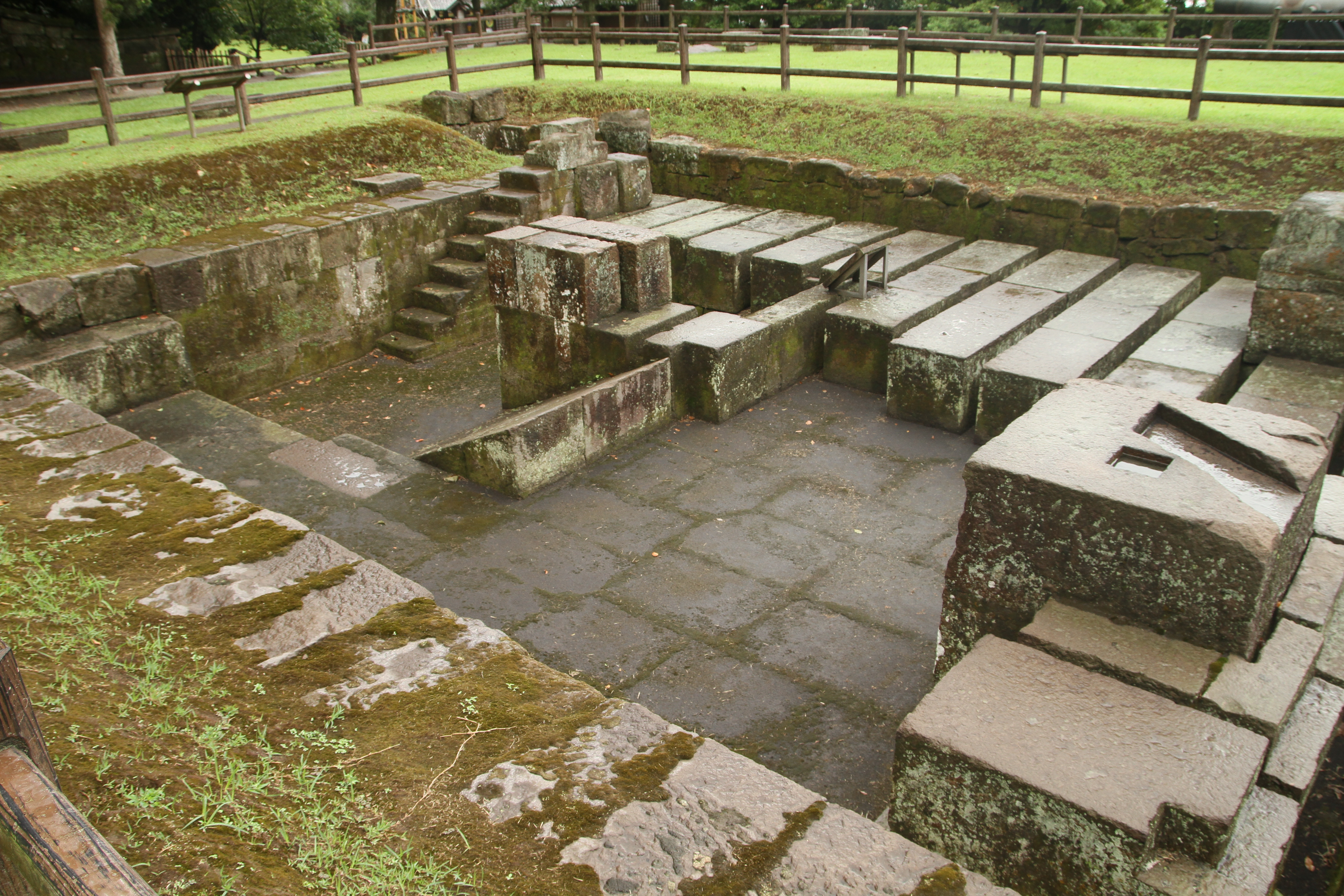
Remains of Shūseikan Reverbatory Furnaces

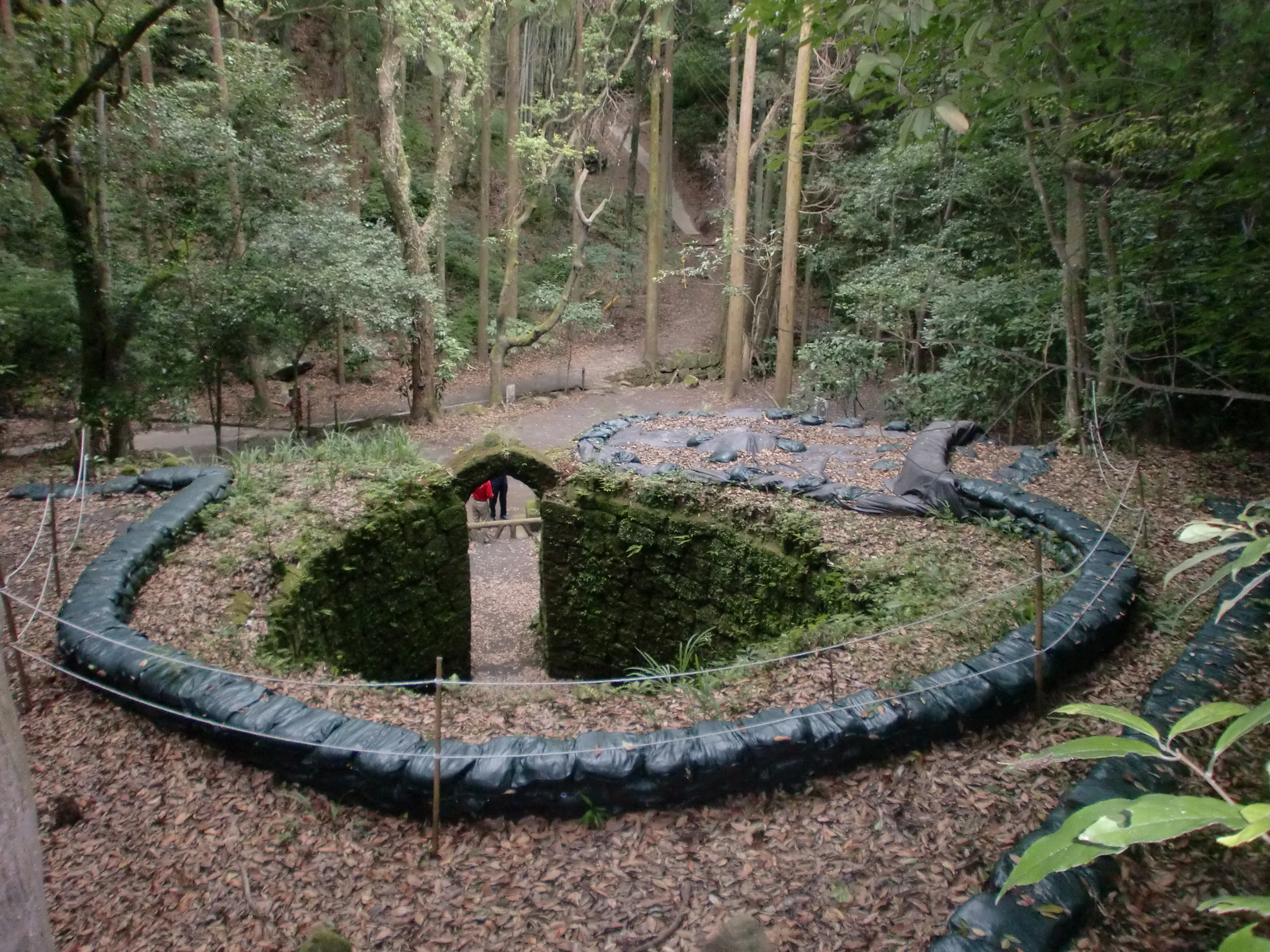
Terayama Charcoal Kiln view from back hill

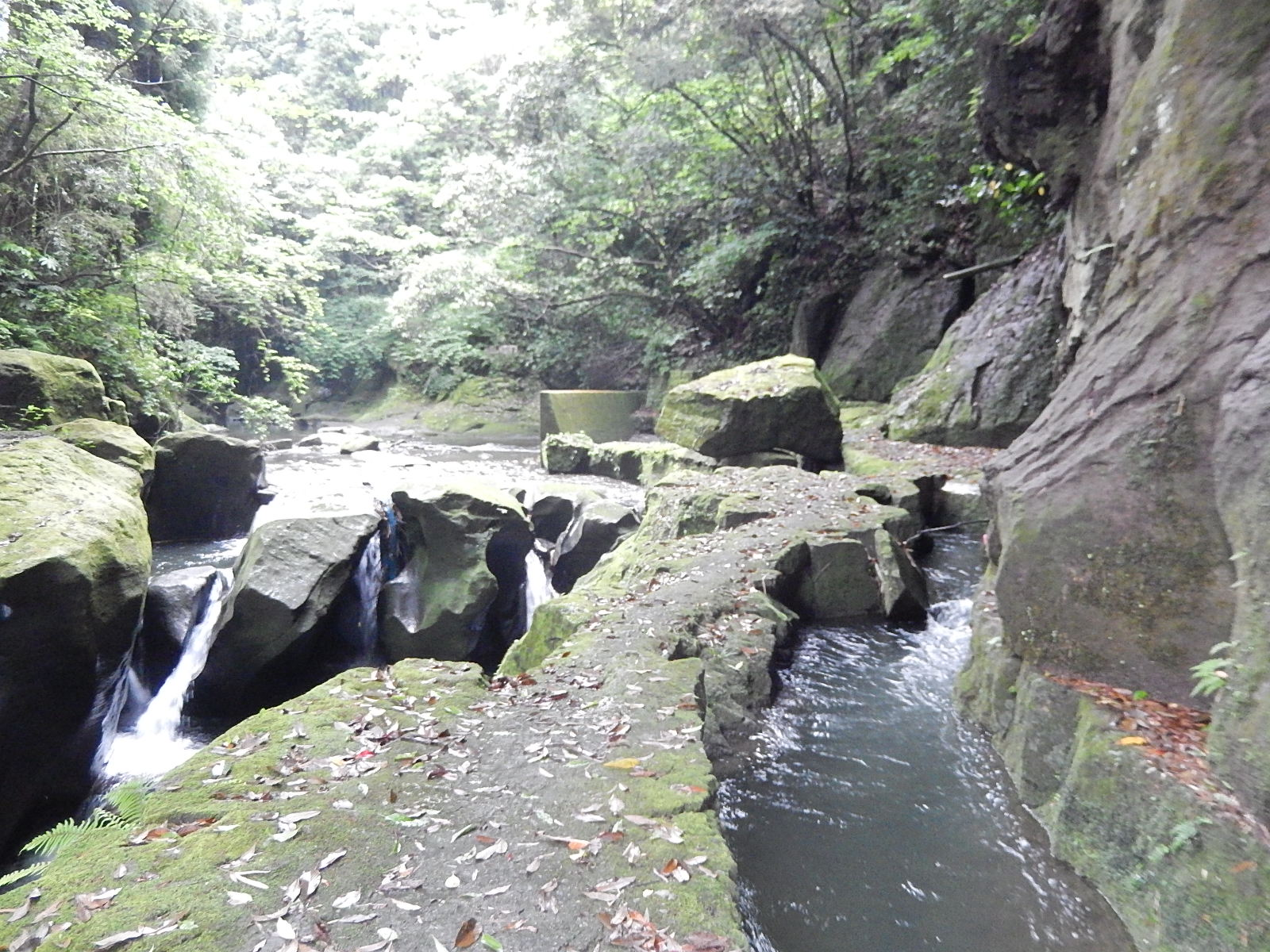
Yoshino leat

The Remains of Shūseikan Reverbatory Furnaces (旧集成館反射炉跡, Shūseikan hansyaro ato) were about 28 feet wide and 25 feet deep, about 3 to 4 feet deep, and constructed with cut stones, but the hearth and chimney have all been lost. There are some details about its function, but it is thought to have been the foundations of two hearths and an ash hole, and there are also culverts on three sides.

In 2015, the building and reverbatory furnace ruins was registered as part of the "Meiji Industrial Revolution Heritage Sites of Japan: Iron and Steel, Shipbuilding, and Coal Mining."

In 2013, two additional areas were added to the National Historic Site designation. One is the ruins of the Terayama Charcoal Kiln (寺山炭窯跡, Terayama sumigama ato), which supplied charcoal to Shuseikan reverberatory furnace and other equipment. It is located in the mountains about 5.5 kilometers north-northeast of Shuseikan. It consists of the remains of three large kilns built in 1858. These kilns were modeled after charcoal kilns in Kii Province and about 3 meters high, with oval shaped inside chambers with a long diameter of about 6 meters and a short diameter of about 5 meters, an entrance about 1 meter wide, and an arched stone on top. The other location is the Sekiyoshi Sluice gate of Yoshino leat (関吉の疎水溝, Yoshino no sosuikō) which was originally built in the first half of the 18th century to take water from the Abeki River, a tributary of the Inari River, about 4 kilometers northwest of Shuseikan, for the purpose of irrigating new rice fields and supplying water to the Shimazu clan villa, Sengan-en. Later, during the rule of Shimazu Nariakira, the course of the canal was partially altered and it was used to supply water to the waterwheels and other power sources of the Shuseikan project. It is an open canal made of welded tuff on three sides. Both of these additional areas are also part of the "Meiji Industrial Revolution Heritage Sites of Japan: Iron and Steel, Shipbuilding, and Coal Mining."

== See also ==
- List of Historic Sites of Japan (Kagoshima)
- Sites of Japan's Meiji Industrial Revolution: Iron and Steel, Shipbuilding and Coal Mining
