= Mie Prefectural Art Museum =

- 三重県立美術館
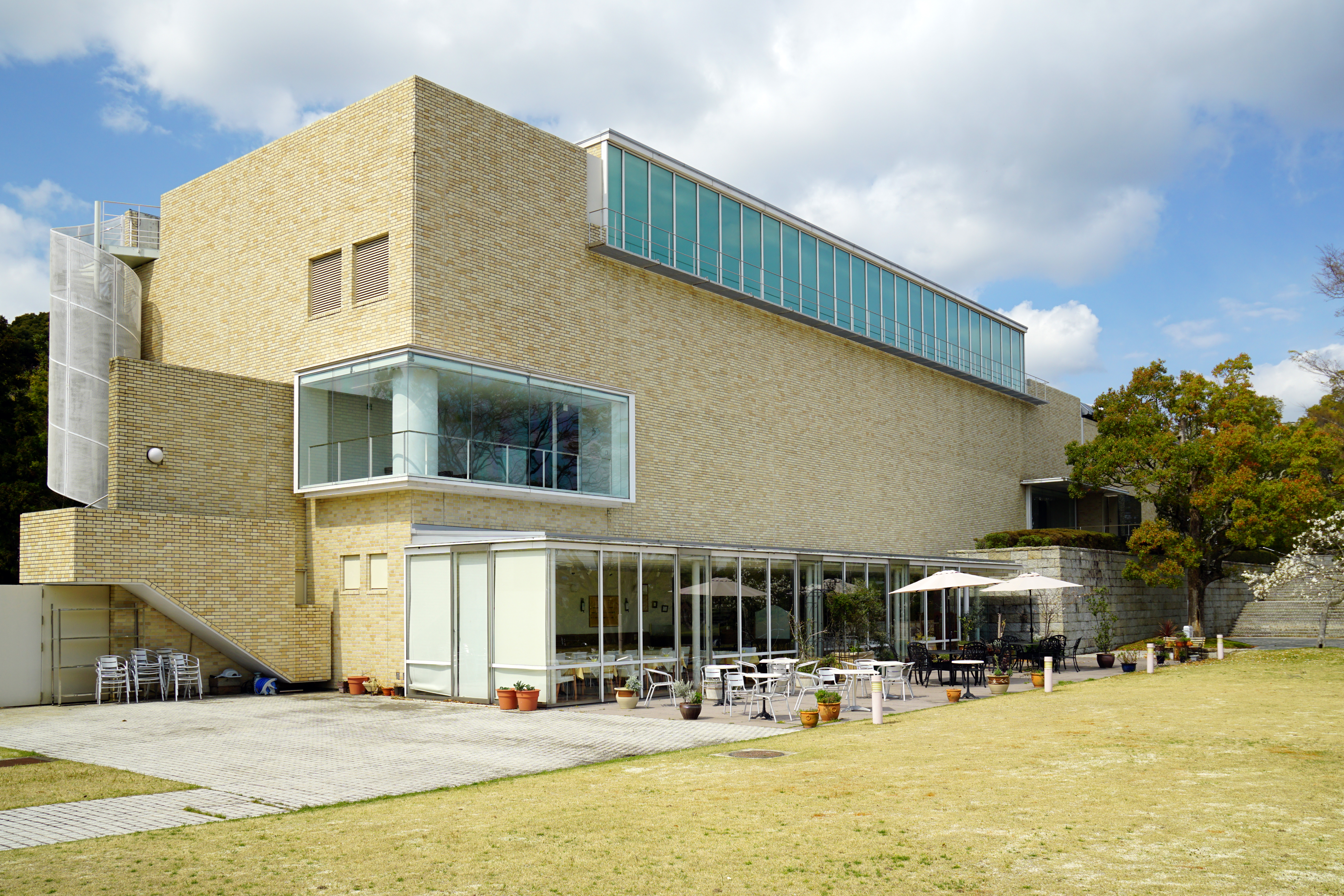
- Interactive map of the Mie Prefectural Art Museum area

General information
- Location: 11 Ōtani-chō, Tsu, Mie Prefecture, Japan
- Coordinates: 34°44′06″N 136°30′07″E
- Opened: September 1982

Website
- Official website

Mie Prefectural Art Museum (三重県立美術館, Mie kenritsu bijutsukan) opened in Tsu, Mie Prefecture, Japan, in 1982. The collection has a particular emphasis on yōga.

== See also ==
- Mie Prefectural Museum
- List of Cultural Properties of Japan - paintings (Mie)
