= Mie Prefectural Museum =

- 三重県総合博物館
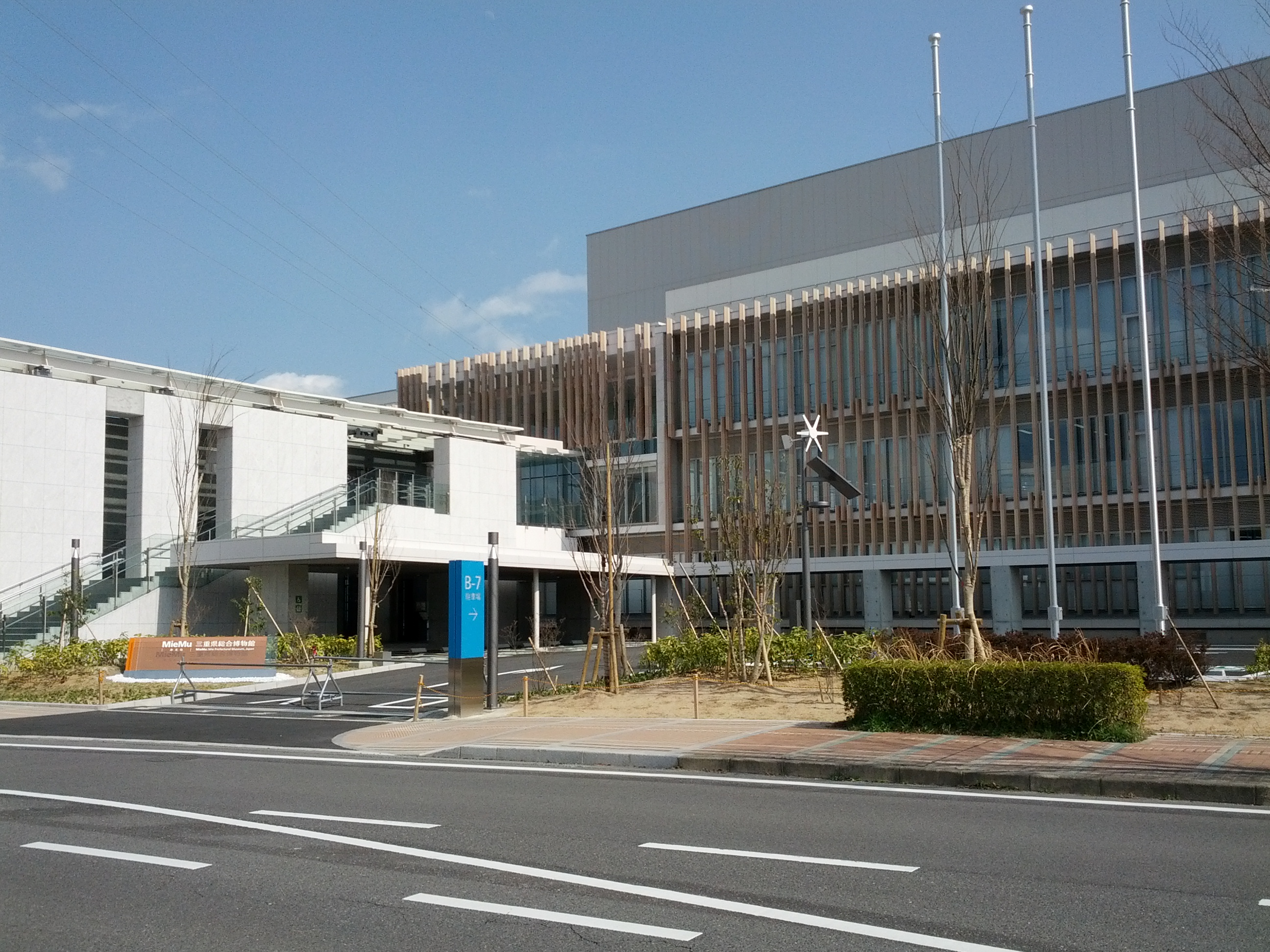
- Interactive map of the Mie Prefectural Museum area

General information
- Location: 3060 Isshinden-kōzubeta, Tsu, Mie Prefecture, Japan
- Coordinates: 34°44′32″N 136°30′06″E
- Opened: 19 April 2014 (1953)

Website
- Official website (jp)

Mie Prefectural Museum (三重県総合博物館, Mie-ken sōgō hakubutsukan) opened on a new site in Tsu, Mie Prefecture, Japan, in 2014. Also known as MieMu, it replaced the former Mie Prefectural Museum (三重県立博物館, Mie kenritsu hakubutsukan) which opened in 1953 and closed in 2014.

== See also ==
- List of Historic Sites of Japan (Mie)
- List of Cultural Properties of Japan - historical materials (Mie)
- Mie Prefectural Art Museum
