= University Art Museum (Tokyo University of the Arts) =

University Art Museum, Tokyo University of the Arts
- 東京藝術大学大学美術館
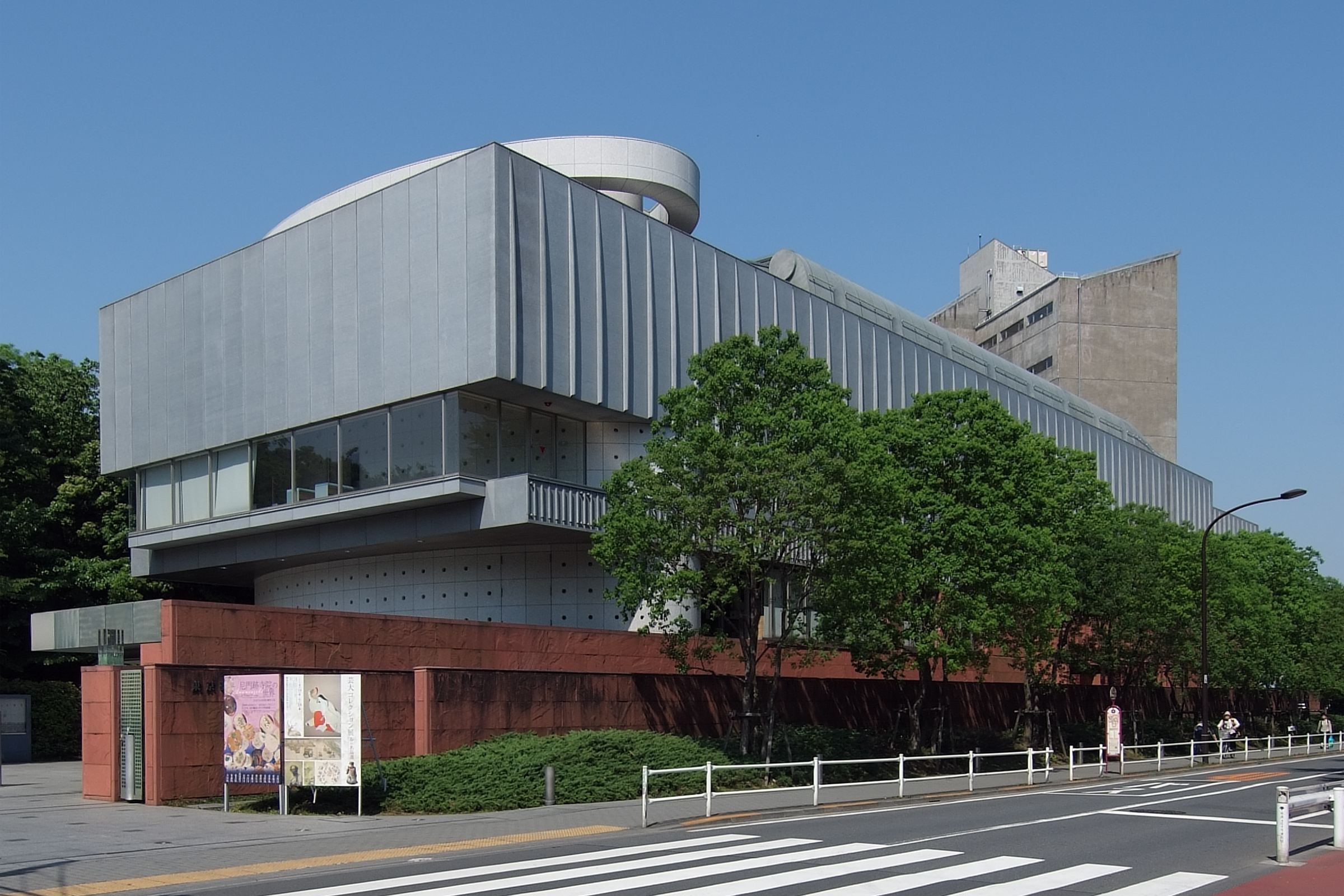
- Established: 1994 (Toride); 1999 (Ueno Pavilion); 2024 (Toride Storage)
- Location: Omonma, Toride, Ibaraki, Japan
- Coordinates: 35°53′03″N 140°06′56″E
- Type: University museum
- Collection size: 30,000 works
- Owner: Tokyo University of the Arts
- Website: Official website

The University Art Museum at the Tokyo University of the Arts (東京藝術大学大学美術館, Tōkyō Geijutsu Daigaku Daigaku Bijutsukan) is an art museum that opened in Omonma, Toride, Ibaraki, Japan in 1994, followed by the Ueno Pavilion in Ueno Park, Taitō, Tokyo, Japan, which opened in 1999. The collection, numbering some thirty thousand works of art, includes twenty-three National Treasures and Important Cultural Properties, among them a Nara period scroll of the Illustrated Sutra of Cause and Effect and paintings by Asai Chū, Harada Naojirō, Hashimoto Gahō, Kanō Hōgai, Ogata Kōrin, Takahashi Yuichi, and Uemura Shōen.

== See also ==
- List of National Treasures of Japan (paintings)
- List of Cultural Properties of Japan - paintings (Tōkyō)
