= Kagoshima Prefectural Museum of Culture Reimeikan =

- 鹿児島県歴史資料センター黎明館
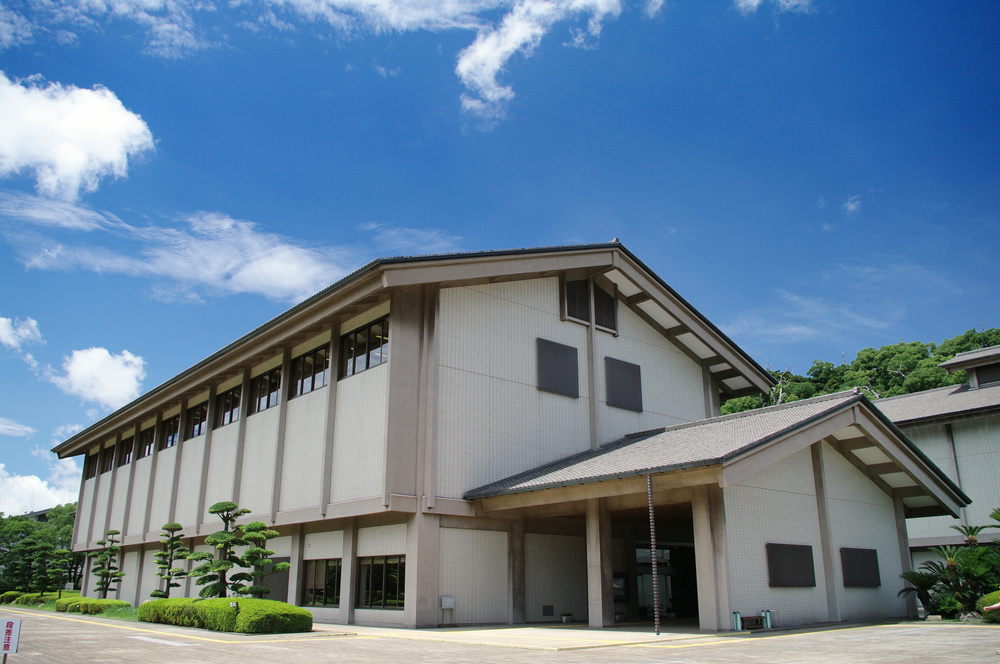
- Interactive map of the Kagoshima Prefectural Museum of Culture Reimeikan area

General information
- Location: 7-2 Shiroyama-chō, Kagoshima, Kagoshima Prefecture, Japan
- Coordinates: 31°35′55″N 130°33′17″E
- Opened: 1983

Website
- http://www.pref.kagoshima.jp/reimeikan/ (ja)

Kagoshima Prefectural Museum of Culture Reimeikan (鹿児島県歴史資料センター黎明館, Kagoshima-ken Rekishi Shiryō Sentā Reimeikan) opened in Kagoshima, Japan, in 1983. The museum, located in the grounds of Tsurumaru Castle, exhibits materials relating to the history and culture of Kagoshima Prefecture.

== See also ==
- List of Historic Sites of Japan (Kagoshima)
