= List of cultural properties of Japan – paintings (Kōchi) =

This list is of paintings designated in the category of paintings (絵画, kaiga) for the Prefecture of Kōchi, Japan.

== National Cultural Properties ==
As of 1 July 2019, two Important Cultural Properties have been designated, being of national significance.

Property	Date	Municipality	Ownership	Comments	Image	Dimensions	Coordinates	Ref.
Chōsokabe Motochika, colours on silk 絹本著色長宗我部元親像 kenpon chakushoku Chōsokabe Motochika zō	1599	Kōchi	Hada Jinja (秦神社) (kept at Kōchi Prefectural Museum of History)	1 scroll		105.2 centimetres (3 ft 5.4 in) by 54.5 centimetres (1 ft 9.5 in)	33°35′46″N 133°37′24″E	
Fugen Enmei, colours on silk 絹本著色普賢延命像 kenpon chakushoku Fugen Enmei zō	late Kamakura period	Kōchi	Ryūjō-in (龍乗院)	1 scroll; with twenty arms and riding on four elephants		107.0 centimetres (3 ft 6.1 in) by 56.2 centimetres (1 ft 10.1 in)	33°34′13″N 133°33′04″E	

== Prefectural Cultural Properties ==
As of 1 May 2019, six properties have been designated at a prefectural level.

Property	Date	Municipality	Ownership	Comments	Image	Dimensions	Coordinates	Ref.
Paintings at Yōhō-ji 要法寺の画像; Yōhōji no gazō	Muromachi and Edo period	Kōchi	Yōhō-ji (要法寺)	designation comprises five scrolls: (1) Yamauchi Yasutoyo, colours on paper (紙本著色山内康豊画像, shihon chakushoku Yamauchi Yasutoyo gazō); (2) Jisenin, colours on silk (絹本著色慈仙院画像, kenpon chakushoku Jisenin gazō); (3) Etenin, colours on silk (絹本著色恵沾院画像, kenpon chakushoku Etenin gazō); (4) Thirty Guardian Deities, colours on paper (紙本著色三十番神画像, shihon chakushoku Yamauchi Yasutoyo gazō); and (5) Kishimojin, colours on paper (紙本著色鬼子母神画像, shihon chakushoku Kishimojin gazō); (4) & (5) date to the Muromachi period and (1), (2), & (3) to the Edo period		(1) 90.8 centimetres (2 ft 11.7 in) by 44.3 centimetres (1 ft 5.4 in); (2) 77.7 centimetres (2 ft 6.6 in) by 33.5 centimetres (1 ft 1.2 in); (3) 86.0 centimetres (2 ft 9.9 in) by 34.9 centimetres (1 ft 1.7 in); (4) 70.8 centimetres (2 ft 3.9 in) by 38.0 centimetres (1 ft 3.0 in); and (5) 65.7 centimetres (2 ft 1.9 in) by 25.9 centimetres (10.2 in)	33°33′11″N 133°32′14″E	
Buddhist Paintings at Kongōchō-ji 金剛頂寺の仏画; Kongōchōji no butsuga		Muroto	Kongōchō-ji (金剛頂寺)	designation comprises eight scrolls: (1) Jizō Bosatsu, colours on silk (絹本著色地蔵菩薩像, kenpon chakushoku Jizō Bosatsu zō); (2) Kokūzō Bosatsu, colours on silk (絹本著色虚空蔵菩薩像, kenpon chakushoku Kokūzō Bosatsu zō); (3) Nirvana painting, colours on silk (絹本著色仏涅槃図, kenpon chakushoku Butsu nehan zu); (4) Monju Bosatsu with Hair in Five Knots, colours on silk (絹本著色五髻文殊菩薩像, kenpon chakushoku go motodori Monju Bosatsu zō); (5) Ryōzu Aizen Mandala, colours on silk (絹本著色両頭愛染曼荼羅図, kenpon chakushoku Ryōzu Aizen mandala zu); (6) Aizen Myōō, colours on silk (絹本著色愛染明王像, kenpon chakushoku Aizen Myōō zō); (7) Aji, embroidered silk (絹本刺繍阿字図, kenpon shishū Aji zu); (8) Shaka with Sixteen Benevolent Deities, colours on silk (絹本著色釈迦十六善神像, kenpon chakushoku Shaka jūroku zenjin zō); Kongōchō-ji is Temple 26 on the Shikoku 88 Temple Pilgrimage			33°18′26″N 134°07′23″E	
Mandala of the Two Realms, colours on silk 絹本著色両界曼陀羅 kenpon chakushoku ryōkai mandara		Nankoku	Tosa Kokubun-ji (土佐国分寺)	Tosa Kokubun-ji is Temple 29 on the Shikoku 88 Temple Pilgrimage			33°35′55″N 133°38′26″E	
Deeds of Kōya Daishi, colours on paper 紙本著色高野大師行状図画 shihon chakushoku Kōya Daishi kōjō zuga	1416	Tosashimizu	Kongōfuku-ji	five emakimono; copies of the ten-scroll 1319 original; Kongōfuku-ji is Temple 38 on the Shikoku 88 Temple Pilgrimage			32°43′34″N 133°01′07″E	
Thirty Guardian Deities, at Shinjō-ji, ita-e 真静寺三十番神板絵; Shinjōji sanjū banshin ita-e		Shimanto	Shinjō-ji (真静寺)	3 wooden boards			32°57′49″N 132°49′45″E	
Former Akaoka Town Byōbu Tosa Scenes of Kabuki 旧赤岡町の土佐芝居絵屏風 kyū-Akaoka-chō no Tosa shibai-e byōbu	C19	Kōnan	Ekin Museum	twenty-three two-fold screens by Hirose Kinzō (1812-1876), also known as Ekin; displayed annually at the Ekin Festival			33°32′30″N 133°43′28″E	

== See also ==
- Cultural Properties of Japan
- List of National Treasures of Japan (paintings)
- Japanese painting
- List of Historic Sites of Japan (Kōchi)
- List of Cultural Properties of Japan - historical materials (Kōchi)
