= Kōchi Castle Museum of History =

- 高知県立高知城歴史博物館
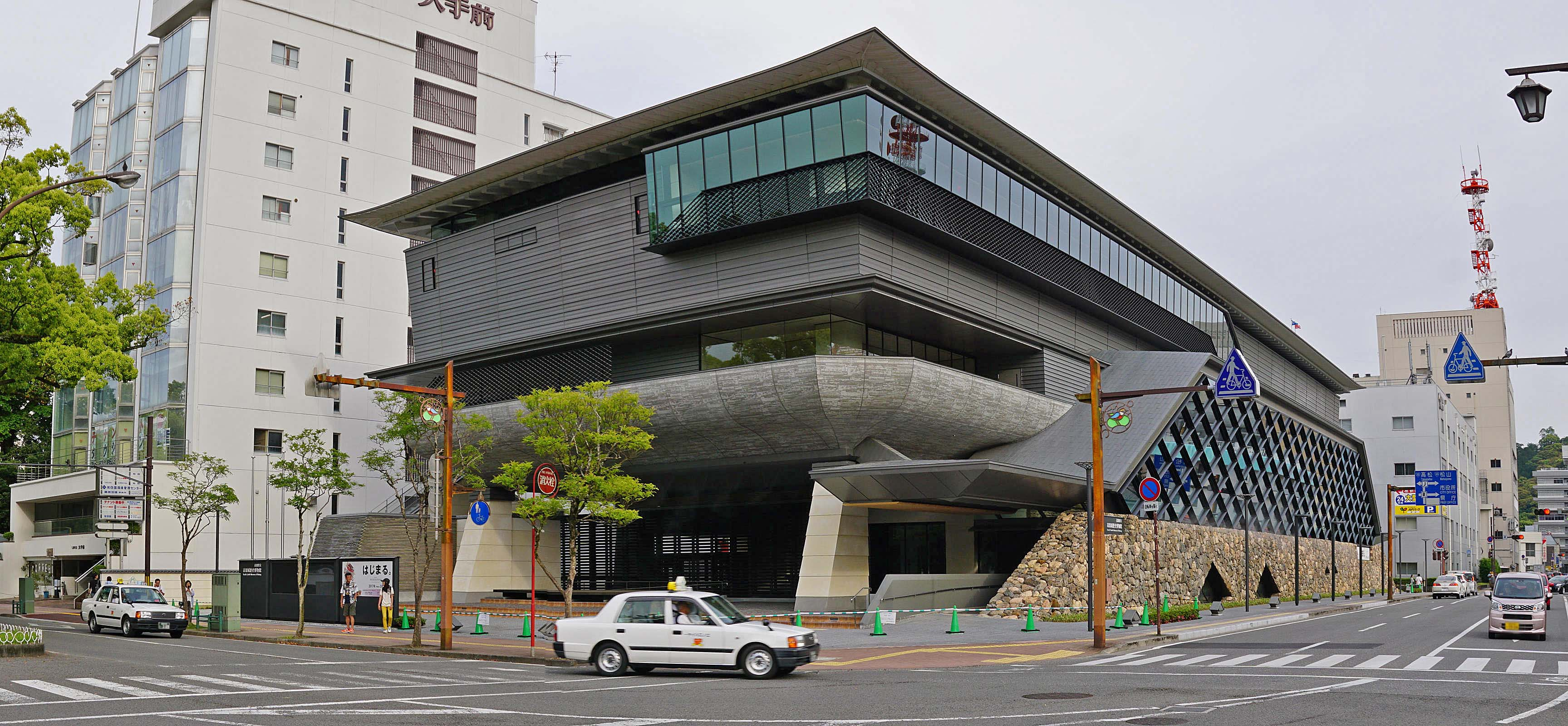
- Interactive map of the Kōchi Castle Museum of History area

General information
- Location: 2-7-5 Ōtesuji, Kōchi, Kōchi Prefecture, Japan
- Coordinates: 33°33′37″N 133°32′02″E
- Opened: March 2017

Website
- Official website

Kōchi Castle Museum of History (高知県立高知城歴史博物館, Kōchi Kenritsu Kōchi-jō Rekishi Hakubutsukan) opened in Kōchi, Kōchi Prefecture, Japan, in 2017. Located beside the main gate of Kōchi Castle, the collection tells the history of the Tosa Domain and of the Prefecture, and comprises the 67,000 items formerly preserved, researched, and exhibited at the Tosa Yamauchi Family Treasury and Archives.

== See also ==
- Kōchi Prefectural Museum of History
- List of Historic Sites of Japan (Kōchi)
- Tosa Domain
- List of Cultural Properties of Japan - paintings (Kōchi)
- List of Cultural Properties of Japan - historical materials (Kōchi)
