= Cape Ashizuri =

Southernmost point of the island of Shikoku, Japan

Cape Ashizuri 足摺岬
- Cape
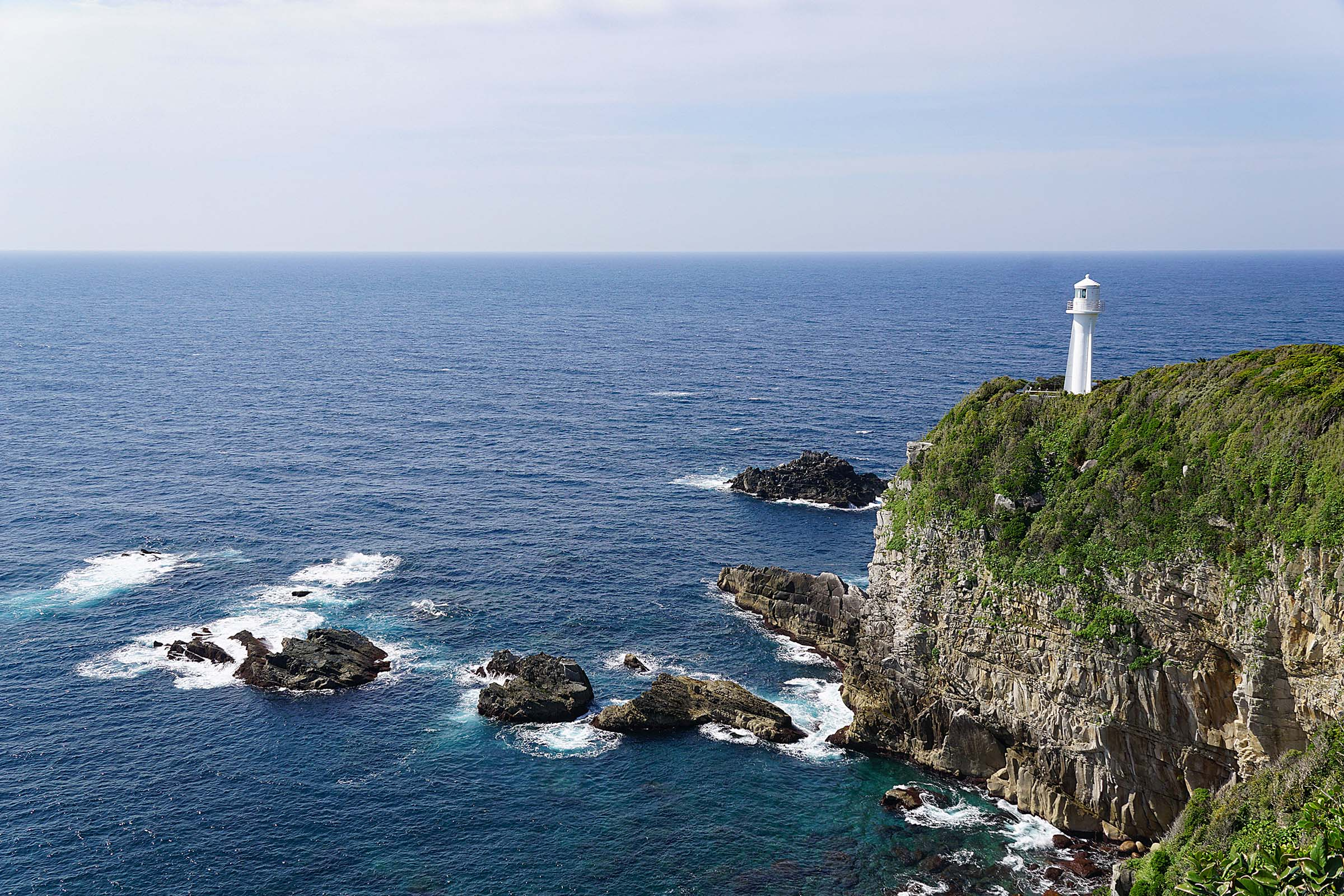
- Cape Ashizuri Lighthouse above the cape

- Location within Kochi Prefecture Location within Japan
- Coordinates: 32°43′26″N 133°01′13″E
- Location: Tosashimizu, Kōchi Prefecture, Japan

Cape Ashizuri (足摺岬, Ashizuri-misaki) is a headland at the southernmost tip of the Japanese island of Shikoku, in the city of Tosashimizu, Kōchi Prefecture. The promontory extends into the Pacific Ocean and is situated within Ashizuri-Uwakai National Park. Above the cape is Cape Ashizuri Lighthouse, which started operating in 1914, and two observatories, while a short distance inland stand Kongōfuku-ji, the thirty-eighth temple on the Shikoku Pilgrimage, and a bronze statue of Nakahama Manjirō, who was born nearby. Due to coastal erosion, there are a number of caves around the cape, including Hakusan Cave, said to be the largest granite cave in the country and a Prefectural Natural Monument.

== See also ==
- List of Places of Scenic Beauty of Japan (Kōchi)
- List of Natural Monuments of Japan (Kōchi)
- Kuroshio Current
- Cape Muroto
