= Tosashimizu =

Tosashimizu 土佐清水市
- City
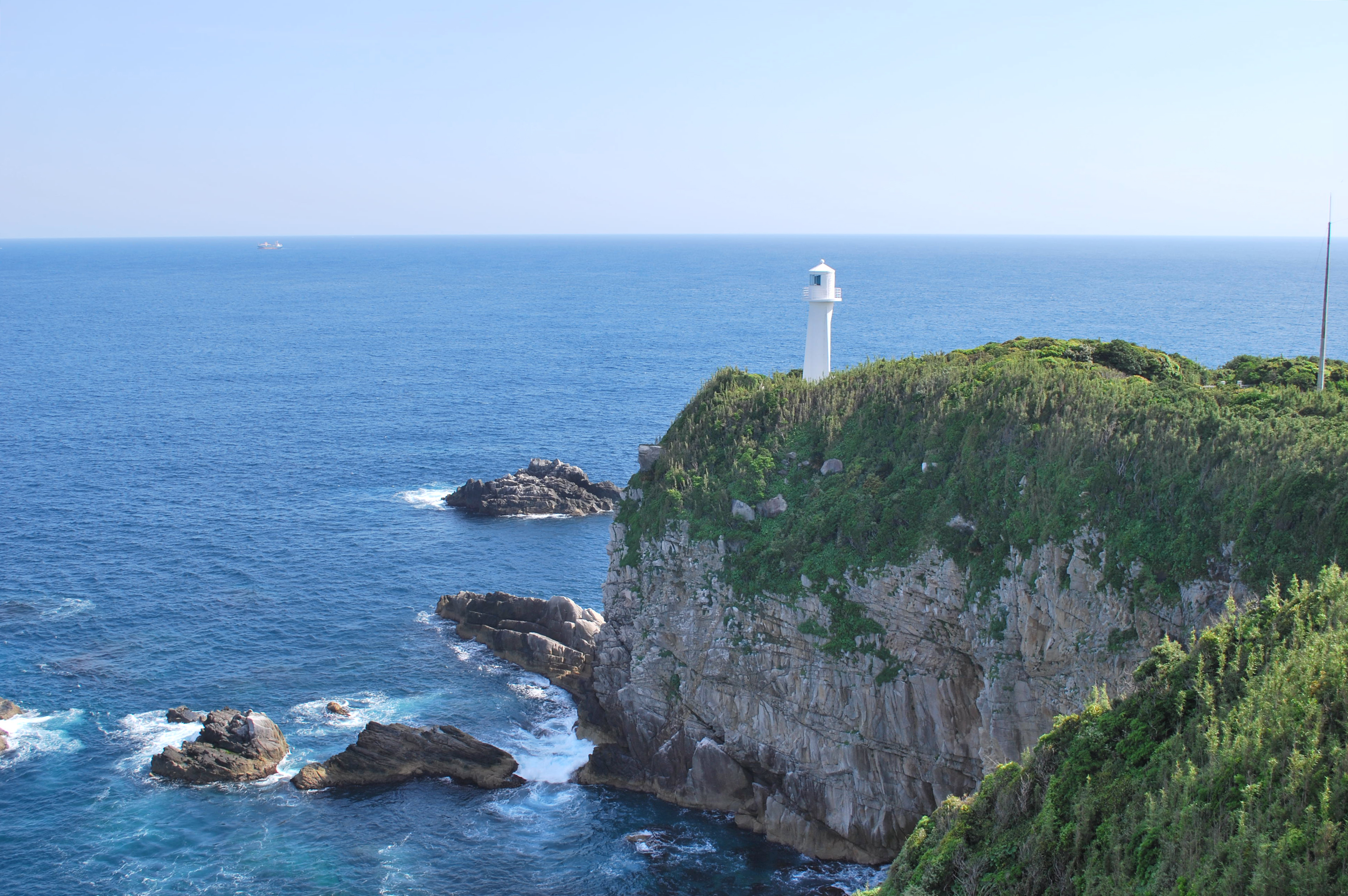
- View of Pacific Ocean and Cape Ashizuri

- Flag Seal
- /0/queryThe property query is required; /0/idsThe property ids is required; /0Failed to match at least one schema; /0/titleThe property title is required; /0/serviceDoes not have a value in the enumeration ["page"]; /0Failed to match exactly one schema; /0/geometriesThe property geometries is required; /0/typeDoes not have a value in the enumeration ["GeometryCollection"]; /0/typeDoes not have a value in the enumeration ["MultiPolygon"]; /0/typeDoes not have a value in the enumeration ["Point"]; /0/typeDoes not have a value in the enumeration ["MultiPoint"]; /0/typeDoes not have a value in the enumeration ["LineString"]; /0/typeDoes not have a value in the enumeration ["MultiLineString"]; /0/typeDoes not have a value in the enumeration ["Polygon"]; /0/coordinatesThe property coordinates is required; /0/geometryThe property geometry is required; /0/typeDoes not have a value in the enumeration ["Feature"]; /0/featuresThe property features is required; /0/typeDoes not have a value in the enumeration ["FeatureCollection"]; Location of Tosashimizu in Kōchi Prefecture

- Location in Japan
- Coordinates: 32°47′N 132°57′E
- Country: Japan
- Region: Shikoku
- Prefecture: Kōchi

Government
  - Mayor: Shinichirō Nishimura

Area
  - Total: 266.34 km^{2} (102.83 sq mi)

Population (31 July 2022)
  - Total: 12,407
  - Density: 46.583/km^{2} (120.65/sq mi)
- Time zone: UTC+09:00 (JST)
- City hall address: 11-2 Tenjinmachi, Tosashimizu-shi, Kōchi-ken 787-0392
- Climate: Cfa
- Website: Official website
- Symbols
- Bird: Blue rock thrush
- Fish: Mejika
- Flower: Camellia
- Tree: Akō (Ficus superba Miq. var. japonica Miq.)

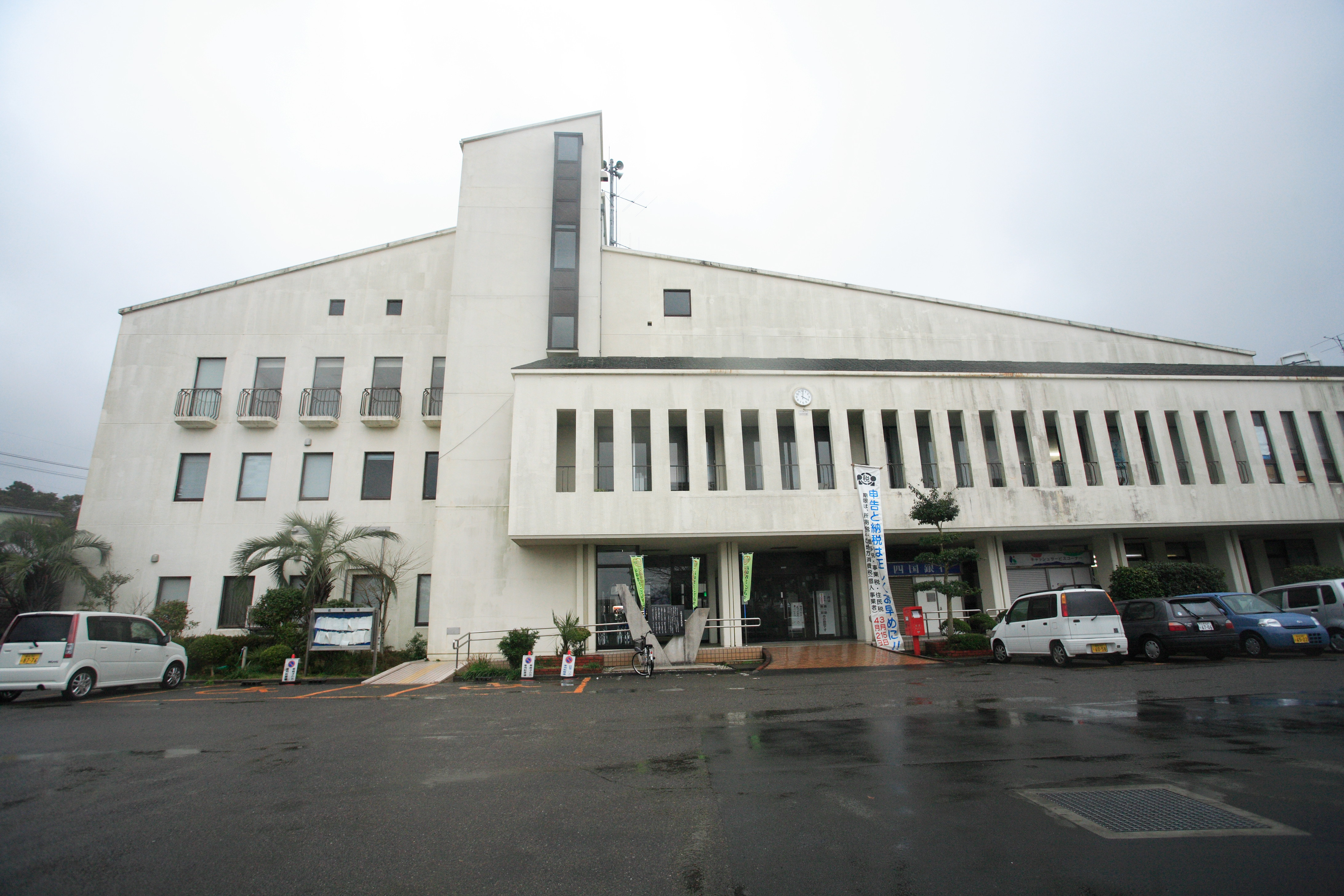
Tosashimizu City Hall

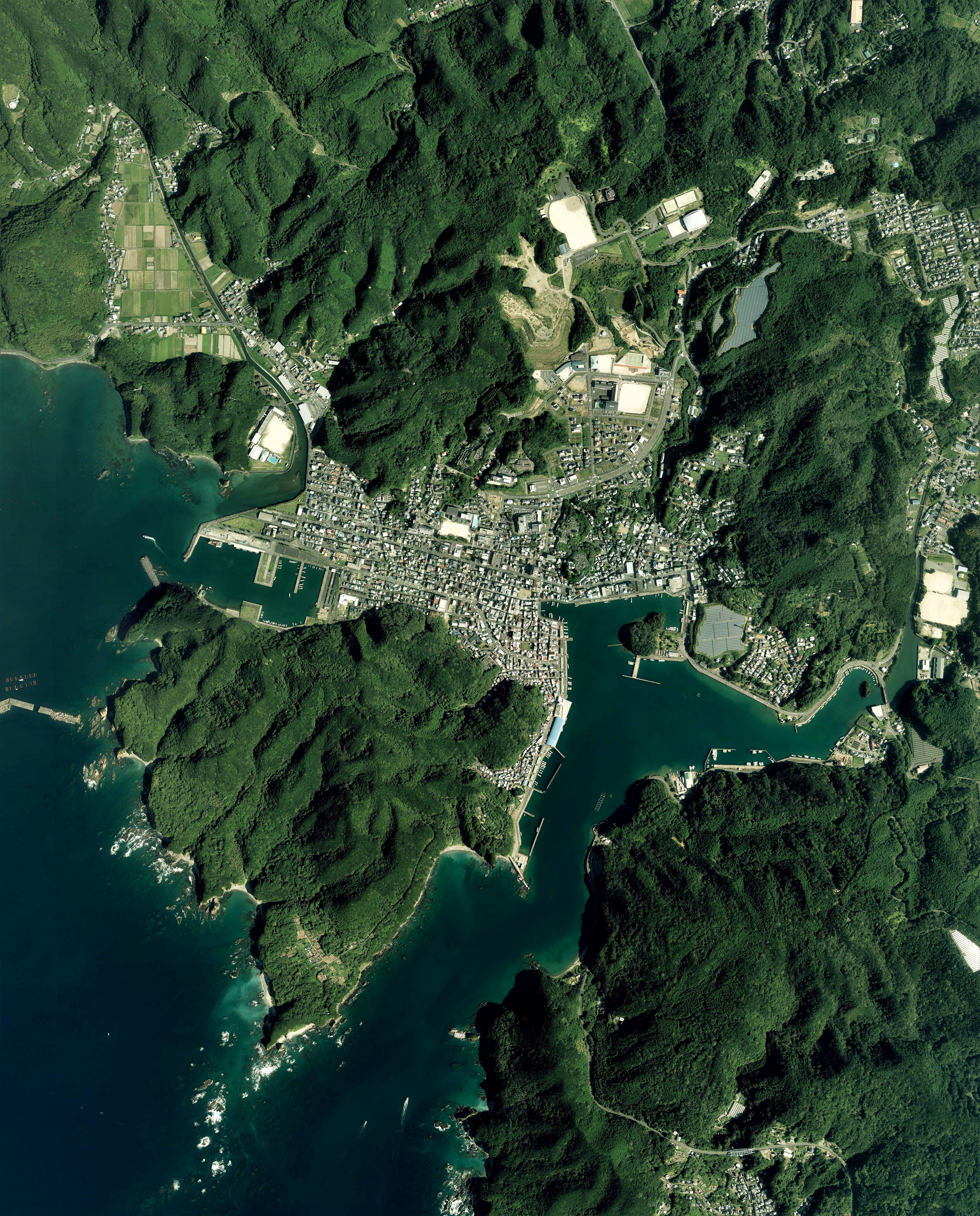
Aerial view of central Tosashimizu City

Tosashimizu (土佐清水市, Tosashimizu-shi) is a city located in the southwest of Kōchi Prefecture, Japan. As of 31 July 2022, the city had an estimated population of 12,407 in 7,004 households, and a population density of 47 persons per km^{2}. The total area of the city is 266.34 square kilometres (102.83 sq mi).

== Geography ==
Tosashimizu is located in far western Kochi Prefecture on the island of Shikoku. Parts of the city are within the borders of the Ashizuri-Uwakai National Park.

=== Neighbouring municipalities ===
Kōchi Prefecture

- Mihara
- Ōtsuki
- Shimanto City
- Sukumo

=== Climate ===
Tosashimizu has a humid subtropical climate (Köppen climate classification Cfa) with hot, humid summers and cool winters. There is significant precipitation throughout the year, especially during June and July. The average annual temperature in Tosashimizu is 18.4 °C (65.1 °F). The average annual rainfall is 2,563.9 mm (100.94 in) with June as the wettest month. The temperatures are highest on average in August, at around 27.7 °C (81.9 °F), and lowest in January, at around 8.9 °C (48.0 °F). The highest temperature ever recorded in Tosashimizu was 37.2 °C (99.0 °F) on 16 August 2024; the coldest temperature ever recorded was −5.0 °C (23.0 °F) on 26 February 1981.

Climate data for Cape Ashizuri, Tosashimizu (1991−2020 normals, extremes 1940−present)
Month	Jan	Feb	Mar	Apr	May	Jun	Jul	Aug	Sep	Oct	Nov	Dec	Year
Record high °C (°F)	22.5 (72.5)	22.5 (72.5)	25.2 (77.4)	26.9 (80.4)	31.3 (88.3)	31.7 (89.1)	35.5 (95.9)	37.2 (99.0)	33.8 (92.8)	31.4 (88.5)	27.7 (81.9)	23.9 (75.0)	37.2 (99.0)
Mean maximum °C (°F)	18.7 (65.7)	19.8 (67.6)	21.4 (70.5)	24.1 (75.4)	27.3 (81.1)	28.8 (83.8)	32.3 (90.1)	32.8 (91.0)	31.4 (88.5)	28.2 (82.8)	24.5 (76.1)	20.8 (69.4)	33.3 (91.9)
Mean daily maximum °C (°F)	12.4 (54.3)	13.4 (56.1)	16.2 (61.2)	20.1 (68.2)	23.4 (74.1)	25.4 (77.7)	28.9 (84.0)	30.4 (86.7)	28.3 (82.9)	24.3 (75.7)	19.7 (67.5)	14.7 (58.5)	21.4 (70.6)
Daily mean °C (°F)	8.9 (48.0)	9.8 (49.6)	12.8 (55.0)	16.9 (62.4)	20.4 (68.7)	23.0 (73.4)	26.5 (79.7)	27.7 (81.9)	25.5 (77.9)	21.4 (70.5)	16.5 (61.7)	11.3 (52.3)	18.4 (65.1)
Mean daily minimum °C (°F)	5.5 (41.9)	6.2 (43.2)	9.1 (48.4)	13.5 (56.3)	17.6 (63.7)	20.9 (69.6)	24.6 (76.3)	25.6 (78.1)	23.2 (73.8)	18.6 (65.5)	13.4 (56.1)	7.9 (46.2)	15.5 (59.9)
Mean minimum °C (°F)	0.0 (32.0)	0.6 (33.1)	2.8 (37.0)	7.3 (45.1)	13.4 (56.1)	17.6 (63.7)	21.6 (70.9)	22.9 (73.2)	19.3 (66.7)	13.1 (55.6)	6.9 (44.4)	2.0 (35.6)	−0.7 (30.7)
Record low °C (°F)	−4.3 (24.3)	−5.0 (23.0)	−3.4 (25.9)	3.2 (37.8)	9.2 (48.6)	14.6 (58.3)	17.3 (63.1)	20.1 (68.2)	14.0 (57.2)	7.3 (45.1)	2.4 (36.3)	−2.0 (28.4)	−5.0 (23.0)
Average precipitation mm (inches)	98.6 (3.88)	116.4 (4.58)	183.9 (7.24)	221.8 (8.73)	232.6 (9.16)	400.2 (15.76)	222.8 (8.77)	231.5 (9.11)	362.4 (14.27)	254.2 (10.01)	146.9 (5.78)	97.0 (3.82)	2,563.9 (100.94)
Average snowfall cm (inches)	trace	trace	0 (0)	0 (0)	0 (0)	0 (0)	0 (0)	0 (0)	0 (0)	0 (0)	0 (0)	trace	1 (0.4)
Average precipitation days (≥ 1.0 mm)	5.8	7.3	10.8	10.0	10.4	14.1	10.5	10.7	12.4	9.7	8.3	6.1	116.1
Average snowy days (≥ 1 cm)	0.2	0.1	0	0	0	0	0	0	0	0	0	0.1	0.4
Average relative humidity (%)	58	59	62	66	73	83	84	82	77	69	65	60	70
Mean monthly sunshine hours	180.5	173.3	190.1	196.0	190.5	131.0	196.6	233.8	175.8	179.7	167.0	174.1	2,190.5
Source: Japan Meteorological Agency

== Demographics ==
Per Japanese census data, the population of Tosashimizu in 2020 is 12,388 people. Tosashimizu has been conducting censuses since 1920. Of the 11 cities in Kochi Prefecture, Tosashimizu has the second-lowest population as of March 31, 2015.

Historical population
Year	Pop.	±%
1920	22,666	—
1925	24,342	+7.4%
1930	25,795	+6.0%
1935	26,270	+1.8%
1940	24,161	−8.0%
1945	29,882	+23.7%
1950	31,656	+5.9%
1955	31,623	−0.1%
1960	29,944	−5.3%
1965	26,725	−10.8%
1970	24,122	−9.7%
1975	24,856	+3.0%
1980	24,252	−2.4%
1985	23,014	−5.1%
1990	21,182	−8.0%
1995	19,582	−7.6%
2000	18,512	−5.5%
2005	17,281	−6.6%
2010	16,029	−7.2%
2015	13,778	−14.0%
2020	12,388	−10.1%
Tosashimizu population statistics

== History ==
As with all of Kōchi Prefecture, the area of Tosashimizu was part of ancient Tosa Province. During the Edo period, the area was part of the holdings of Tosa Domain ruled by the Yamauchi clan from their seat at Kōchi Castle. Following the Meiji restoration, the village of Shimatsu (清松村) within Hata District, Kōchi was established with the creation of the modern municipalities system on April 1, 1889. It changed its name to Shimizu and was elevated to town status in 1924. On August 1, 1954, Shimizu merged with the neighboring towns of Shimokawaguchi, Misaki and Shimokae to form the city of Tosashimizu. On January 14, 2022, a 1-2 metre tall Tsunami struck Tosashimizu due to the 2022 Hunga Tonga–Hunga Haʻapai eruption and tsunami, No deaths were reported due to the tsunami wave. the tsunami was 0.9 m (2 ft 11 in) in height.

== Government ==
Tosashimizu has a mayor-council form of government with a directly elected mayor and a unicameral city council of 12 members. Tosashimizu contributes one member to the Kōchi Prefectural Assembly. In terms of national politics, the city is part of Kōchi 2nd district of the lower house of the Diet of Japan.

Tosashimizu is the only city on Shikoku island that hosts a Japan Air Self-Defense Force (ASDF) base.

== Economy ==
The largest industry is fishing, especially deep-sea fishing. Sōdabushi (宗田節), locally called mejikabushi (メジカ節), is one of the main seafood produce in the area with a market share of approximately 70%. It uses sōdagatsuo (ソウダガツオ; frigate tuna) and is manufactured using a similar process to katsuobushi (鰹節).

The local fishermen's union has registered the brand name/designation of origin "Tosa no Shimizu-saba" (土佐の清水さば, lit. 'blue mackerel of Shimizu, Tosa') for the blue mackerel (ゴマサバ, gomasaba; Scomber australasicus) that they catch locally.

Osaka Aquarium Kaiyukan has a branch in Tosashimizu, and Osaka Aquarium Biological Research Institute of Iburi Center (OBIC) provides one third of those marine animals displayed at the aquarium in Osaka. The center conducts scientific studies at its facility including a 1,600 ton tank.

== Education ==
Tosashimizu has two public elementary schools and one public middle school operated by the city government, and one public high school operated by the Kōchi Prefectural Board of Education.

== Transportation ==
=== Railway ===
Tosashimizu has no passenger railway services. The nearest train station is Nakamura Station, the terminus of the Tosa Kuroshio Railway Nakamura Line, located in Shimanto city. A bus service connects Tosashimizu with Nakamura Station, taking approximately 60 minutes.

=== Highway ===
- National Route 321

== Sister cities ==
- Fairhaven, Massachusetts, United States, since 1987
- New Bedford, Massachusetts, United States, since 1987
- (Japan) Tomigusuku, Okinawa, since February 1993

== Local attractions ==
=== Cape Ashizuri ===
The 70 km coastline stretching from the northeast to southwest boundaries of Tosashimizu attracts over 800,000 tourists to Tosashimizu each year. Ashizuri-Uwakai National Park includes Cape Ashizuri and Ashizuri Peninsula, the largest peninsula in the area and which protrudes into the Pacific Ocean. Cape Ashizuri is 80 meters above sea level at the southeastern end on the peninsula. The peninsula is covered by subtropical plants including camellia, holm oak, and colony of Livistona Livistona chinensis, and the sea is a prime fishing ground for katsuo fish, or skipjack tuna Katsuwonus pelamis. While there are small islands to the south of it, the cape is recognized as the southernmost location on Shikoku island at 32°43′24″N 133°1′12″W.

Tatsukushi geologic strata with layers of sandstone and mudstone form joints and layers. A gate-like rock on the coast, Hakusandōmon is on the west side of the cape. Tōjindaba Site is a prehistoric megalithic site with stone circle, located on the west hill on Cape Ashizuri.

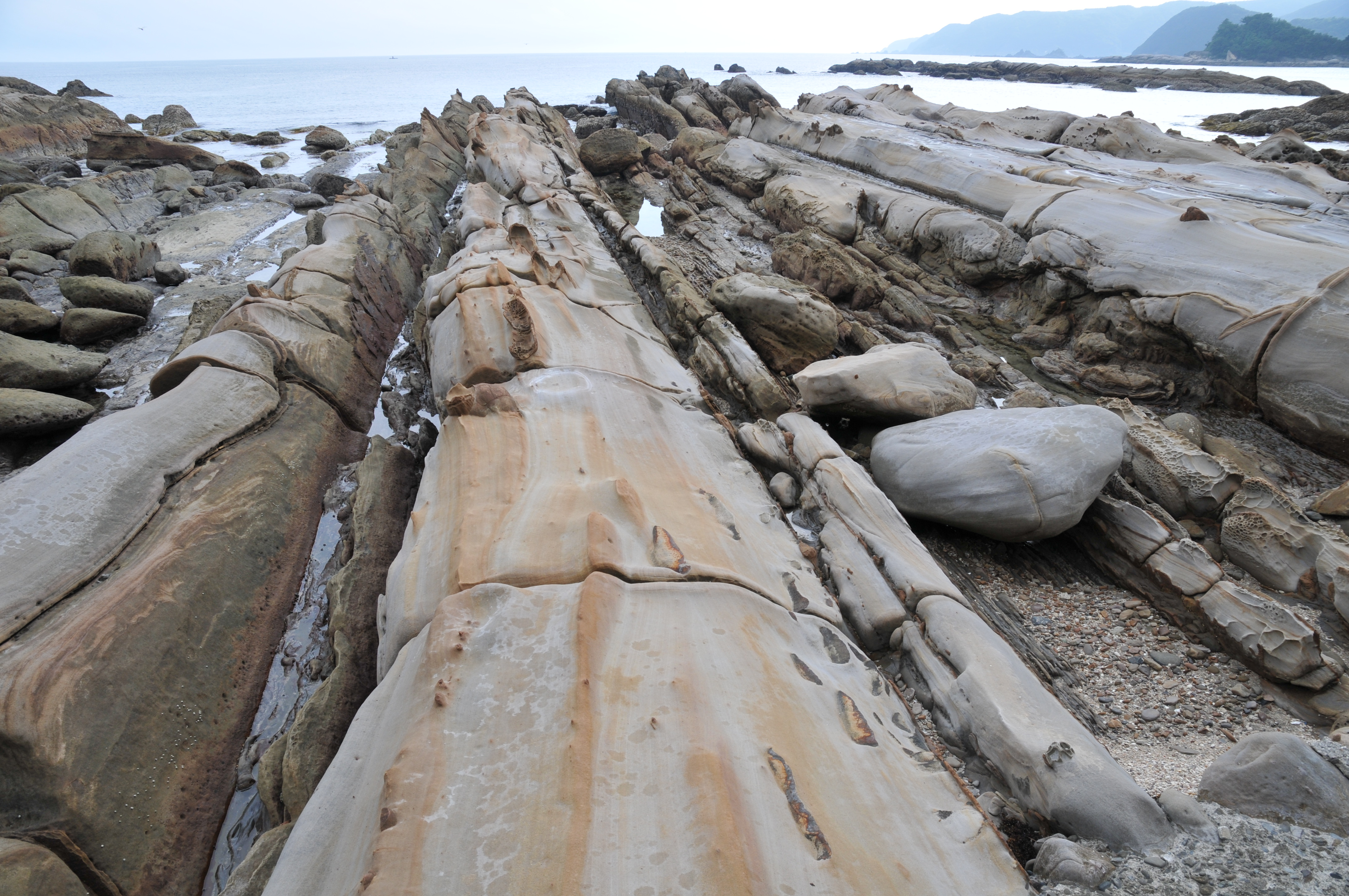
Tatsukushi

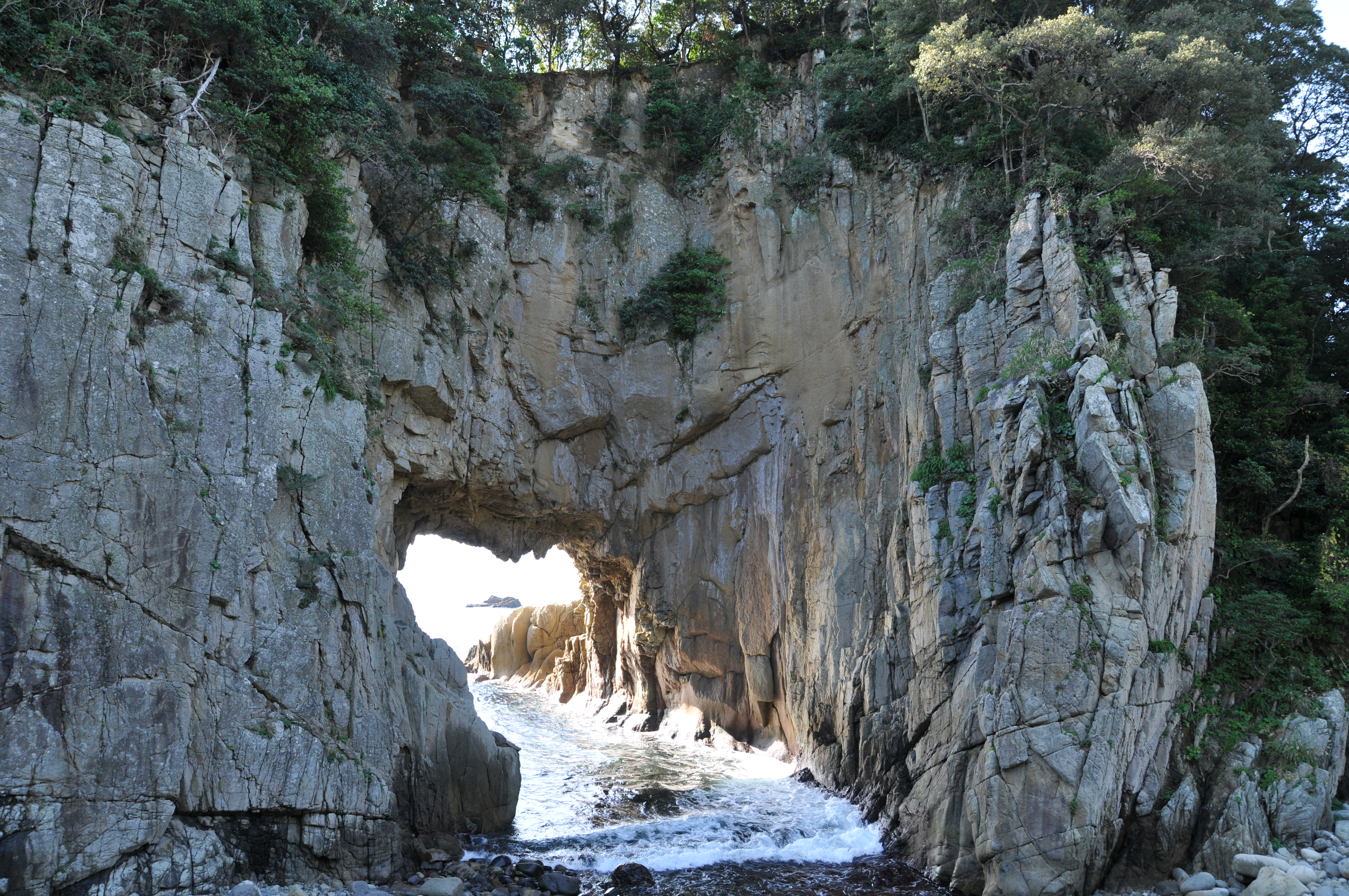
Hakusandōmon

=== Birthplace of Nakahama Manjirō ===
On the western shore of Ashizuri peninsula, lies the village of Nakanohama within Tosashimizu, where Nakahama Manjirō was born and became one of the first Japanese to travel to the United States. Manjirō, a young fisherman, was shipwrecked off the coast of Japan in 1841 and rescued by whaling captain William H. Whitfield of Fairhaven, Massachusetts. Whitfield brought the young Manjirō back to Fairhaven and New Bedford at the end of the whaling voyage, and Manjirō spent several years there before eventually making his way back to Japan. Because of this history, Tosashimizu became the sister city of both Fairhaven and New Bedford in 1987. He became popular as John Manjirō after Ibuse Masuji depicted him in his novel John Manjiro. The Castaway: His Life and His Adventures.

=== Wildlife tours ===
There are several wildlife tours popular on Ashizuri peninsula; wildlife swims are organized in the town of Iburi on the foot of Ashizuri peninsula.

==== Whale shark swim ====
Whale sharks migrate off the Ashizuri Peninsula between June and September, and some are kept captive in a cage 300 m offshore.

==== Ocean sunfish swim ====
Between April and the end of July each year, ocean sunfish are kept in a net cage 10 m by 10 m and 5 m deep. When the water temperature rises, they release the fish into the wild.

==== Whale watching ====
Whale watching is also offered on the east side of the peninsula, based at Kubotsu town to the middle and Shimonokae to the north.

=== The Shikoku Pilgrimage ===
The Shikoku Pilgrimage passes through the city, and the longest stretch of 80.7 km on the route is between the 37th temple (Iwamoto-ji (岩本寺)) in Shimanto and the 38th temple (Kongōfuku-ji (金剛福寺)) on Cape Ashizuri. Descending from Itsuta pass (伊豆田峠) toward Tosashimizu, there is Shinnenan (真念庵), a small wayside hermitage 28 km from Kongōfuku-ji. It was designated to provide a free lodging for pilgrims on that section, where people could also leave their luggage while visiting Kongōfuku-ji, come back to Shinnenan and continue on to the 39th Enkō-ji in Sukumo 50.8 km away.

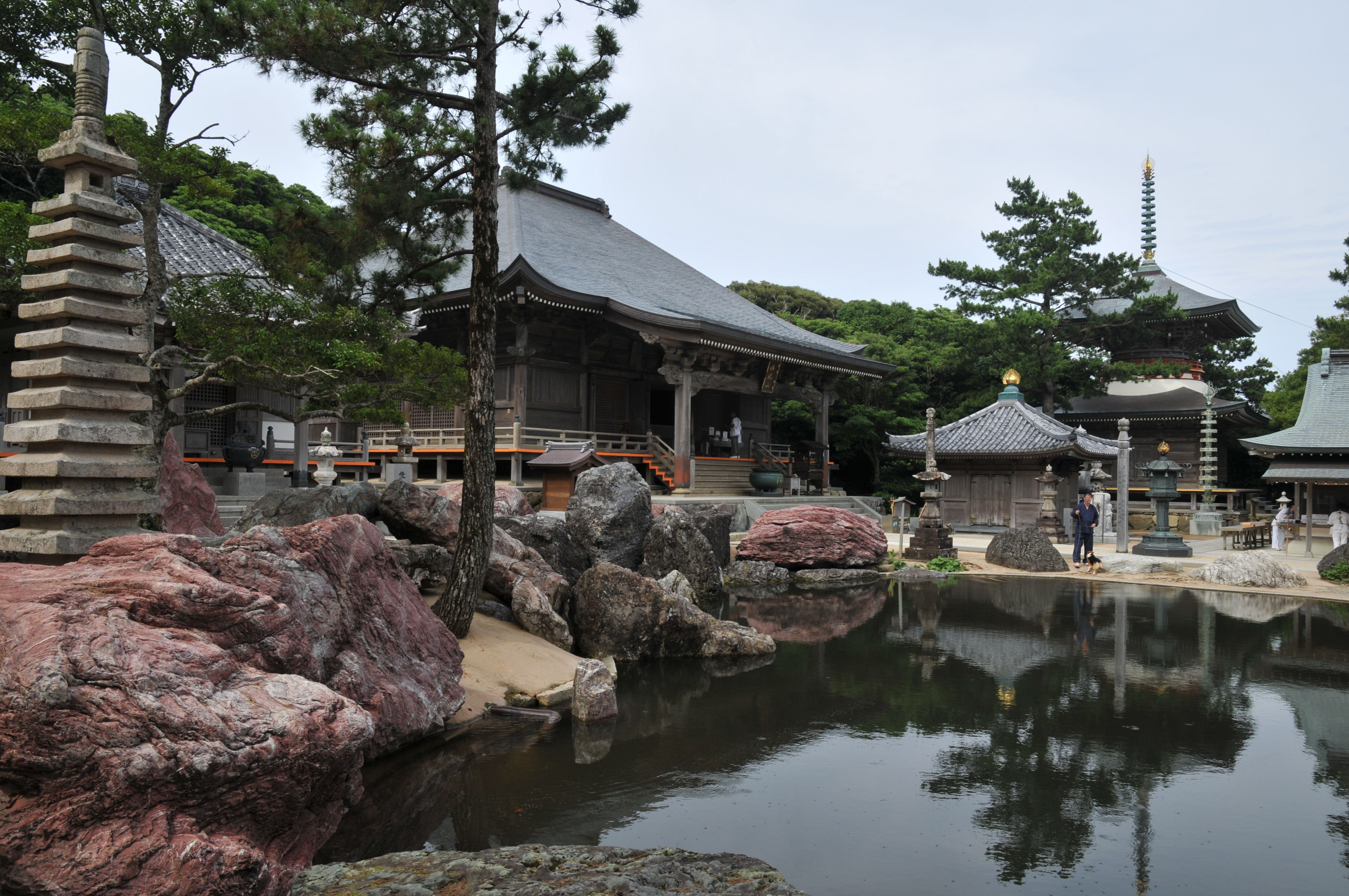
Kongofuku-ji

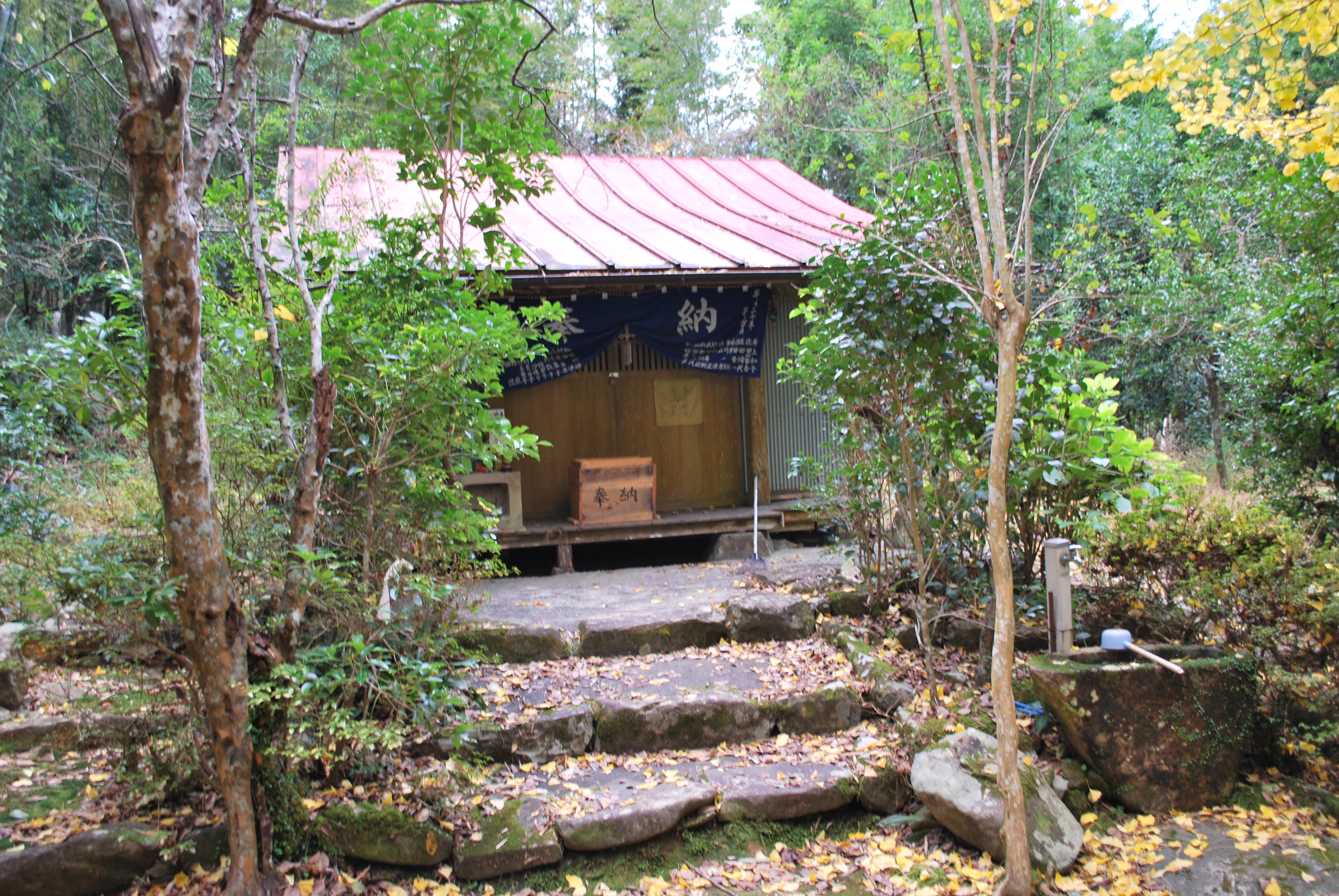
Shinnenan hermitage

=== Roadside stations ===
Mejikano sato Tosashimizu roadside station is near scenic Tatsukushi along route 321. Mejika means sōdagatsuo (frigate mackerel) in the local dialect, and they manufacture and sell sōdabushi, the main sea food produce of the city, processed for demonstration at the factory at the back of the store for direct selling. Farm produce is also sold at this roadside station.
