= Tosa Yamauchi Family Treasury and Archives =

Coordinates: 33°33′19.6″N 133°31′52.5″E

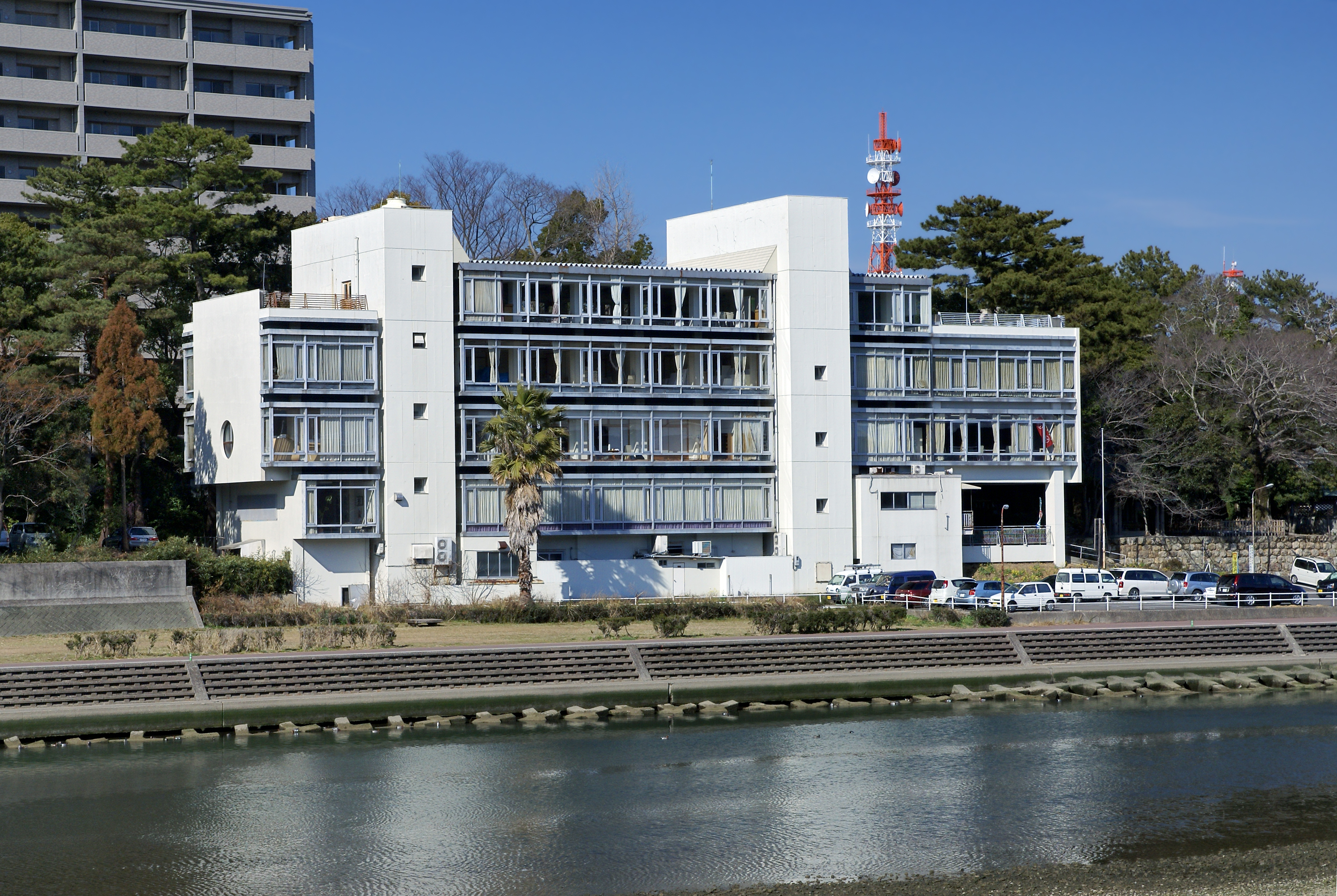
Tosa Yamauchi Family Treasury and Archives in Kochi, Kochi prefecture, Japan.

The Tosa Yamauchi Family Treasury and Archives (土佐山内家宝物資料館, Tosa Yamauchi-ke Hōmotsu Shiryōkan) in Takajō-machi, Kōchi, Kōchi Prefecture, Japan, now permanently closed, formerly housed historical materials related to the Yamauchi clan, rulers of the Tosa Domain. Going back to an agreement between the Yamauchi family and Kōchi Prefecture from December 9, 1994, this foundation was formally established as a collaboration between Kōchi city and Kōchi Prefecture on April 26, 1995, with the aim of preserving and exhibiting the family's ancestral heritage of historical records, arts and crafts items. On May 1 of the same year the museum hall was opened.

The items date to the Edo period and were found in and around Kōchi Castle. Since the Meiji period, they had been in possession of the Yamauchi family. Materials were gradually transferred from the Yamauchi family to the custody of Kōchi Prefecture since April 28, 1995; a process that was completed in July 2004 with the simultaneous transfer of about 36,000 items. Since then, the complete material ancestral heritage of the family, amounting to about 67,000 items, has been held by the archives. In addition the archives have received materials entrusted or donated by temples and shrines.

The museum exhibits the collected items, conducts research and runs training and educational courses. A dedicated department is in charge of restoration and preservation of materials. Regular and special exhibitions on a variety of topics are changed periodically, with about 100 items on display at any given time. The regular exhibition is devoted to the Tosa Domain and the Yamauchi family.

In December 2010, the museum began displaying documents from the Chōsokabe clan, which was ruled by Chōsokabe Motochika (1539–99) from Okō Castle during the Sengoku period. The documents include the oldest paper known to be signed by Chōsokabe Kunichika (Motochika's father), and documents covering the period from when the Chōsokabe clan rose to power until just before their decline.

The archives hold one scroll (no. 20) of the Kōya edition of the Kokin Wakashū from the 11th century Heian period. This is the oldest extant manuscript of the work (Note: Other, equally old, scrolls of the Kōya edition exist.) and has been designated as National Treasure of Japan.

The facility permanently closed on 31 March 2016, in preparation for the opening of the Kōchi Castle Museum of History.

== See also ==
- List of National Treasures of Japan (writings: Japanese books)
- Former Yamauchi Residence
