= Former Yamauchi Residence =

Coordinates: 33°33′20″N 133°31′52″E

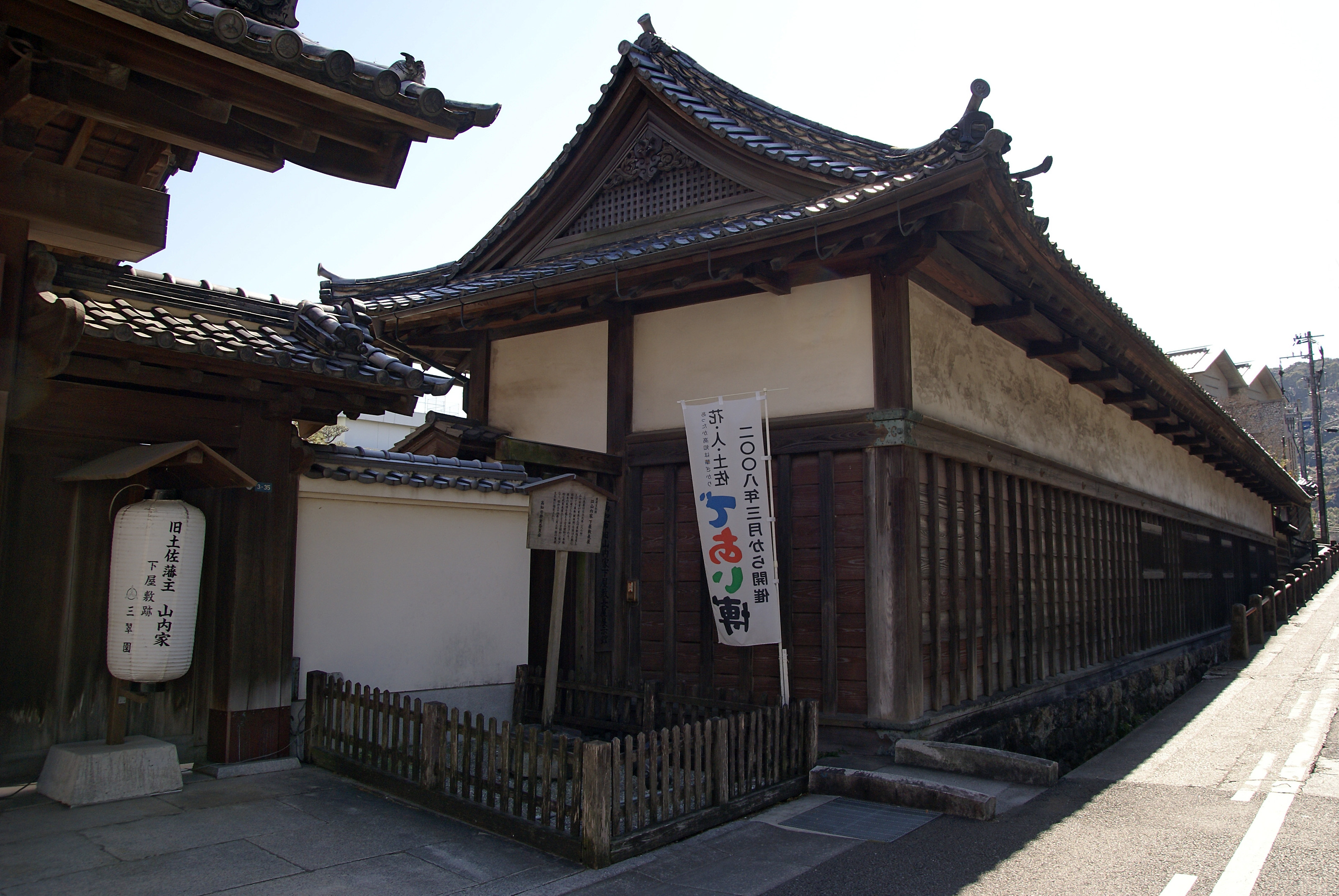
Nagaya, 1864 (ICP)

The Former Yamauchi Residence (旧山内家下屋敷長屋, Kyū Yamauchike shimoyashiki nagaya) in Kōchi, Kōchi Prefecture, Japan belonged to the Yamauchi daimyō of Tosa Domain. The nagaya of 1864, 33.4m x 5.7m, twin storey, with a hip-and-gable tiled roof, is an Important Cultural Property.

== See also ==
- Tosa Yamauchi Family Treasury and Archives
- Kōchi Castle
