= Kongōfuku-ji =

Buddhist temple in Kōchi Prefecture, Japan

Coordinates: 32.726028°N 133.018556°E

Kongōfuku-ji 金剛福寺
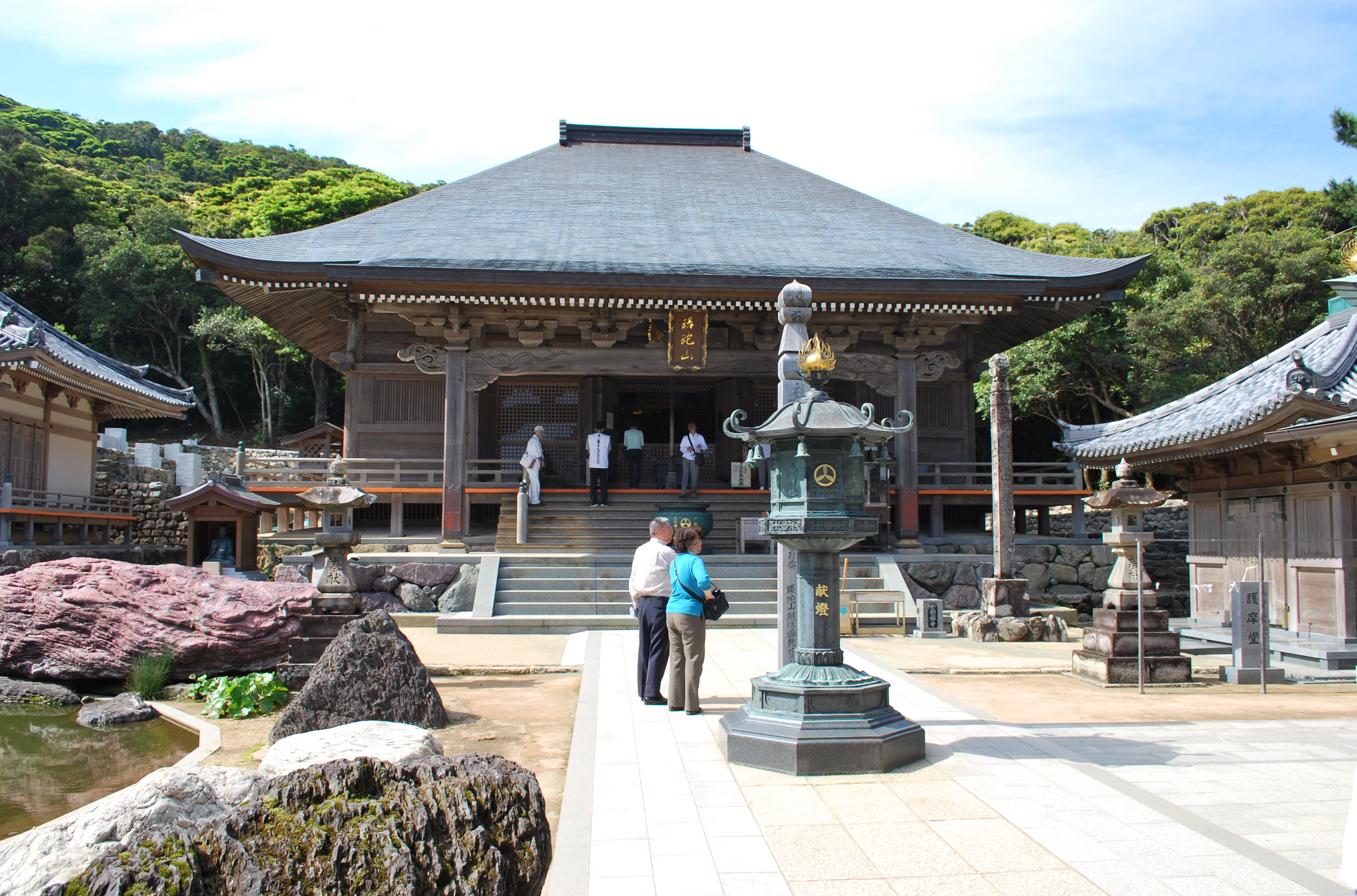
- Hondō of Kongōfuku-ji

Religion
- Affiliation: Shingon, Chisan sect
- Deity: Senju Kannon Bosatsu

Location
- Location: Tosashimizu, Kōchi-ken
- Country: Japan
- Interactive map of Kongōfuku-ji 金剛福寺

Architecture
- Founder: Gyōki
- Completed: 822

Kongōfuku-ji (金剛福寺) is a Buzan Shingon temple in Tosashimizu, Kōchi Prefecture, Japan. Temple 38 on the Shikoku 88 temple pilgrimage, the deity that is worshipped at this temple is Sahasra-bhuja, or Senju Kannon Bosatsu (千手観音菩薩) in Japanese. The temple is said to have been founded by Gyōki in 822.

Kongōfuku-ji is 85 km south of Temple 37 (Iwamoto-ji) and can take an average pilgrim 30 hours to reach on foot. This is the furthest distance between two temples on the Shikoku Pilgrimage.

== Buildings ==
- Hondō
- Sanmon: Niōmon (仁王門)
- Shōrō
- Gomadō (護摩堂): Shrine within the temple grounds to conduct Goma rituals to ask for blessing from deities. Goma is conducted by burning cedar sticks available for purchase next to the gomadō.

== See also ==
- Shikoku 88 Temple Pilgrimage
