= Ashizuri-Uwakai National Park =

National park in Shikoku, Japan

Ashizuri-Uwakai National Park 足摺宇和海国立公園
- IUCN category II (national park)
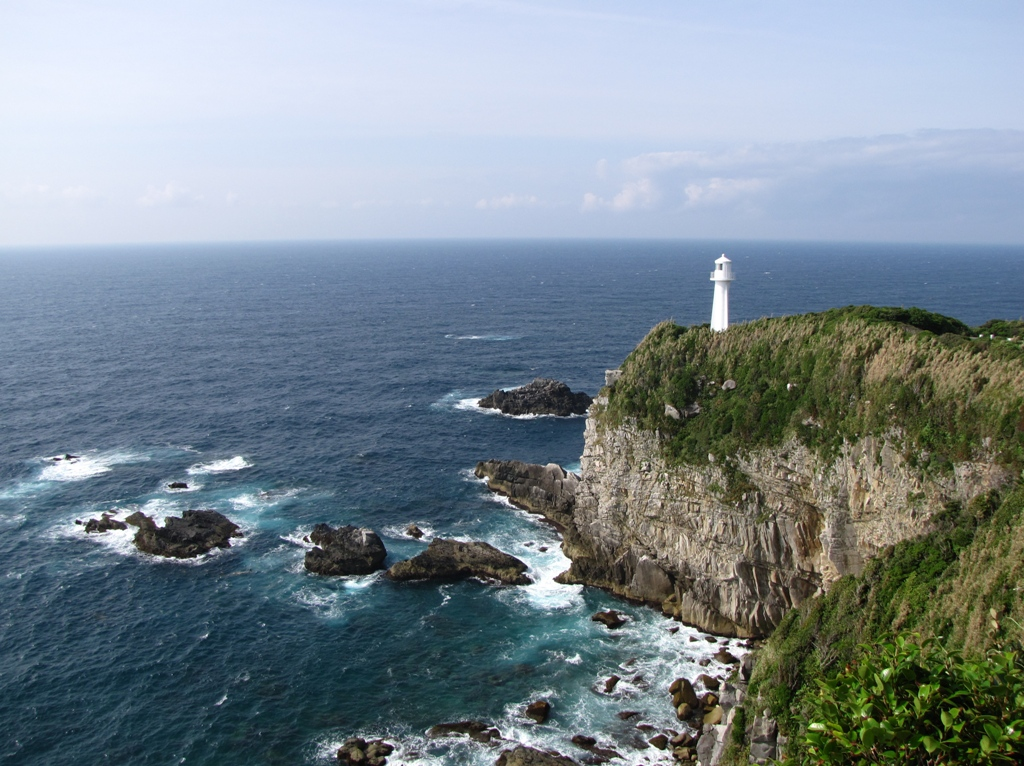
- Cape Ashizuri, Ashizuri-Uwakai National Park

- Location within Japan
- Location: Shikoku, Japan
- Coordinates: 32°43′24″N 133°01′12″E
- Area: 113.45 km^{2} (43.80 sq mi)
- Established: November 10, 1972
- Governing body: Ministry of the Environment (Japan)

Ashizuri-Uwakai National Park (足摺宇和海国立公園, Ashizuri Uwakai Kokuritsu Kōen) is a national park at the southwestern tip of the island of Shikoku, Japan. The park is spread over small areas on the western side of Shikoku in Ehime and Kōchi prefectures. The main feature of the park is Cape Ashizuri, the southernmost point of the island. The cape is noted for its extensive subtropical vegetation and its granite cliffs which offer views of the Pacific Ocean. Nakahama "John" Manjiro, the first Japanese to visit the United States, was born, shipwrecked, and was rescued in the vicinity of the park.
