= Kongōchō-ji =

Buddhist temple in Kōchi Prefecture, Japan

- 金剛頂寺
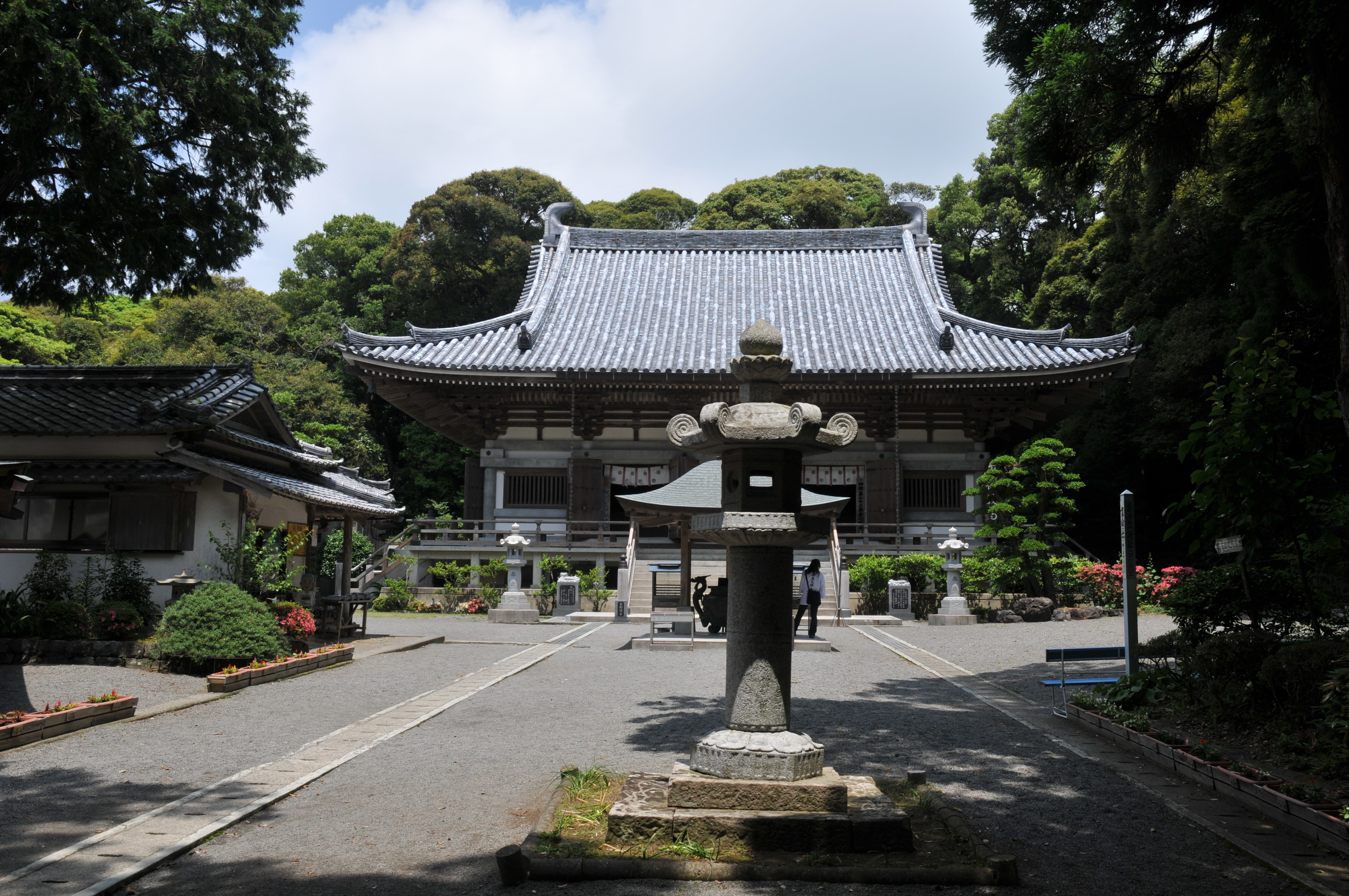

Religion
- Affiliation: Shingon

Location
- Location: Kōchi-ken
- Country: Japan
- Interactive map of Kongōchō-ji
- Coordinates: 33°18′26″N 134°07′22″E

Website
- http://www.88shikokuhenro.jp/26kongochoji/

Kongōchō-ji is a Shingon Buddhist Temple located in Muroto, Kōchi, Japan. It is the 26th temple of the Shikoku Pilgrimage.
