= Kōchi Prefectural Museum of History =

Local museum in Nankoku, Japan

- 高知県立歴史民俗資料館
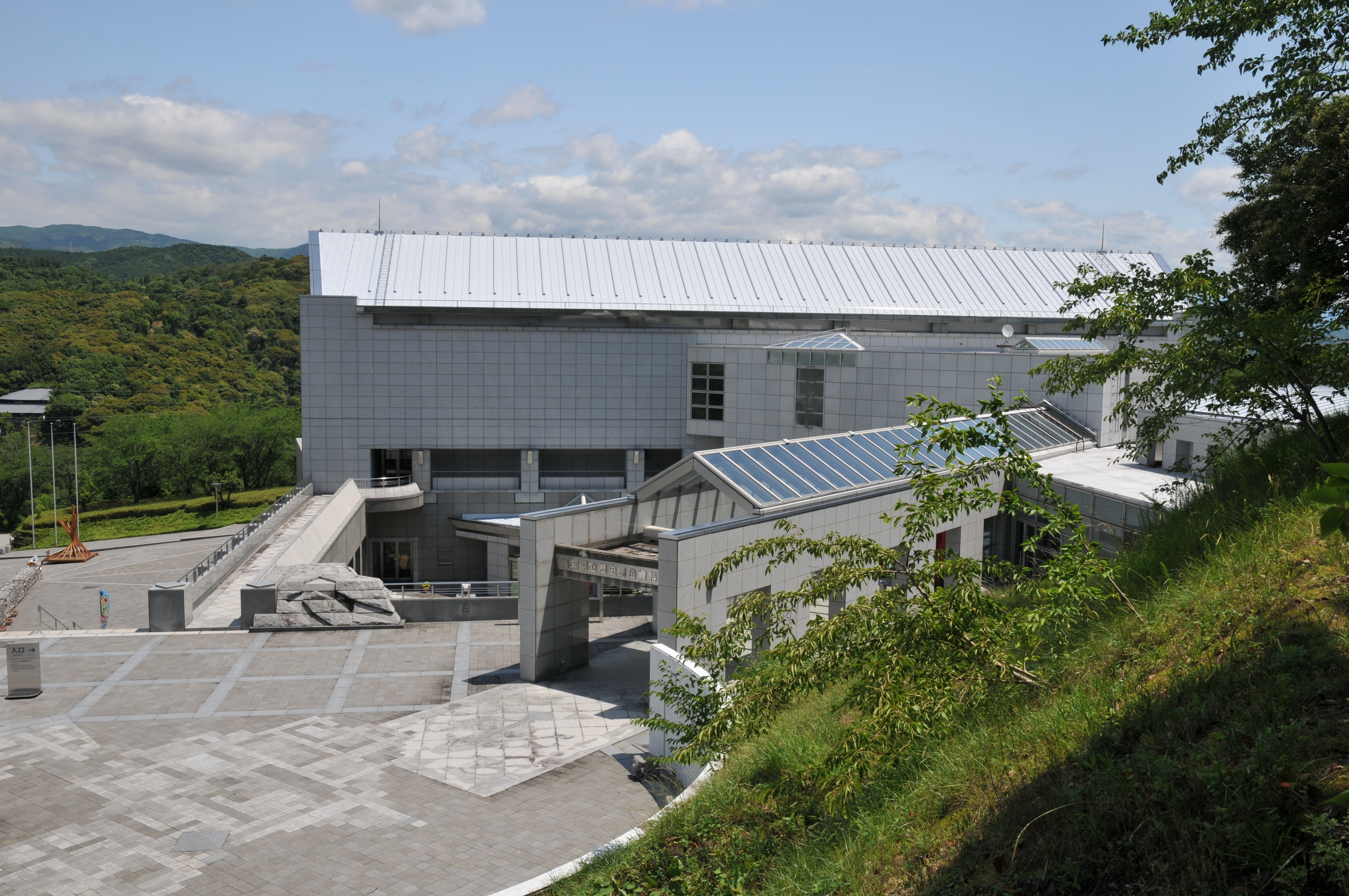
- Interactive map of the Kōchi Prefectural Museum of History area

General information
- Location: 1099-1 Yahata, Okō-chō, Nankoku, Kōchi Prefecture, Japan
- Coordinates: 33°35′46″N 133°37′25″E
- Opened: May 1991

Website
- Official website

Kōchi Prefectural Museum of History (高知県立歴史民俗資料館, Kōchi Kenritsu Rekishi Minzoku Shiryōkan) opened in Nankoku, Kōchi Prefecture, Japan, in 1991. Located on the site of Okō Castle and the Chōsokabe clan residence, the collection relates to the archaeology, history, and folk customs of the area.

== See also ==
- List of Cultural Properties of Japan - paintings (Kōchi)
- List of Cultural Properties of Japan - historical materials (Kōchi)
- List of Historic Sites of Japan (Kōchi)
- Tosa Domain
