= Hirose Kinzō =

Japanese painter

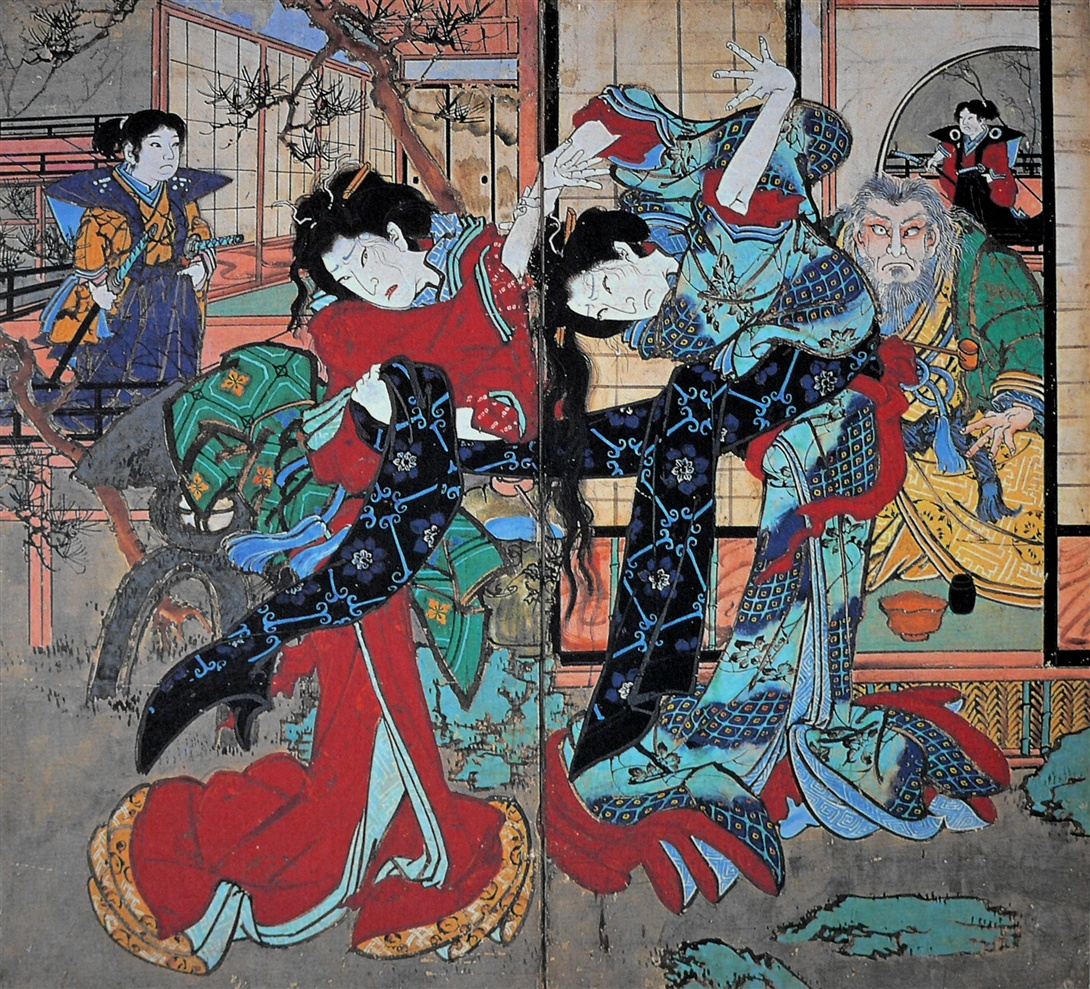
Twenty-three two-fold byōbu by Hirose Kinzō, Tosa Scenes of Kabuki, have been designated a Prefectural Cultural Property

Hirose Kinzō (弘瀬金蔵) (1812–1876), also known as Ekin (絵金), was a Japanese painter of the late-Edo, Bakumatsu, and early-Meiji periods.

== Life ==
Born to a hair-dresser in Kōchi in 1812, Kinzō studied under Ikezoe Yōsai (池添楊斎) before joining the retinue of a Yamauchi princess on her journey to Edo in 1829. There he studied under Kanō Tōhaku (狩野洞白) and Maemura Tōwa (前村洞和), painters of the Kanō and Tosa schools. Returning after three years with the art name Hayasahi Tōi (林洞意), he served as head painter for the Kirima Family (桐間家), chief retainers of the Tosa Domain. However, accused by a rival of forging a work by Kanō Tan'yū, he was dismissed from his post. Little is known of his next ten years. Subsequently, prolific, his surviving works include 70 shibai-e byōbu on theatrical subjects, nine ema, thirteen ema lanterns (絵馬提灯), two emakimono, and seven warai-e or shunga. He also had many disciples.

== Ekin Museum ==
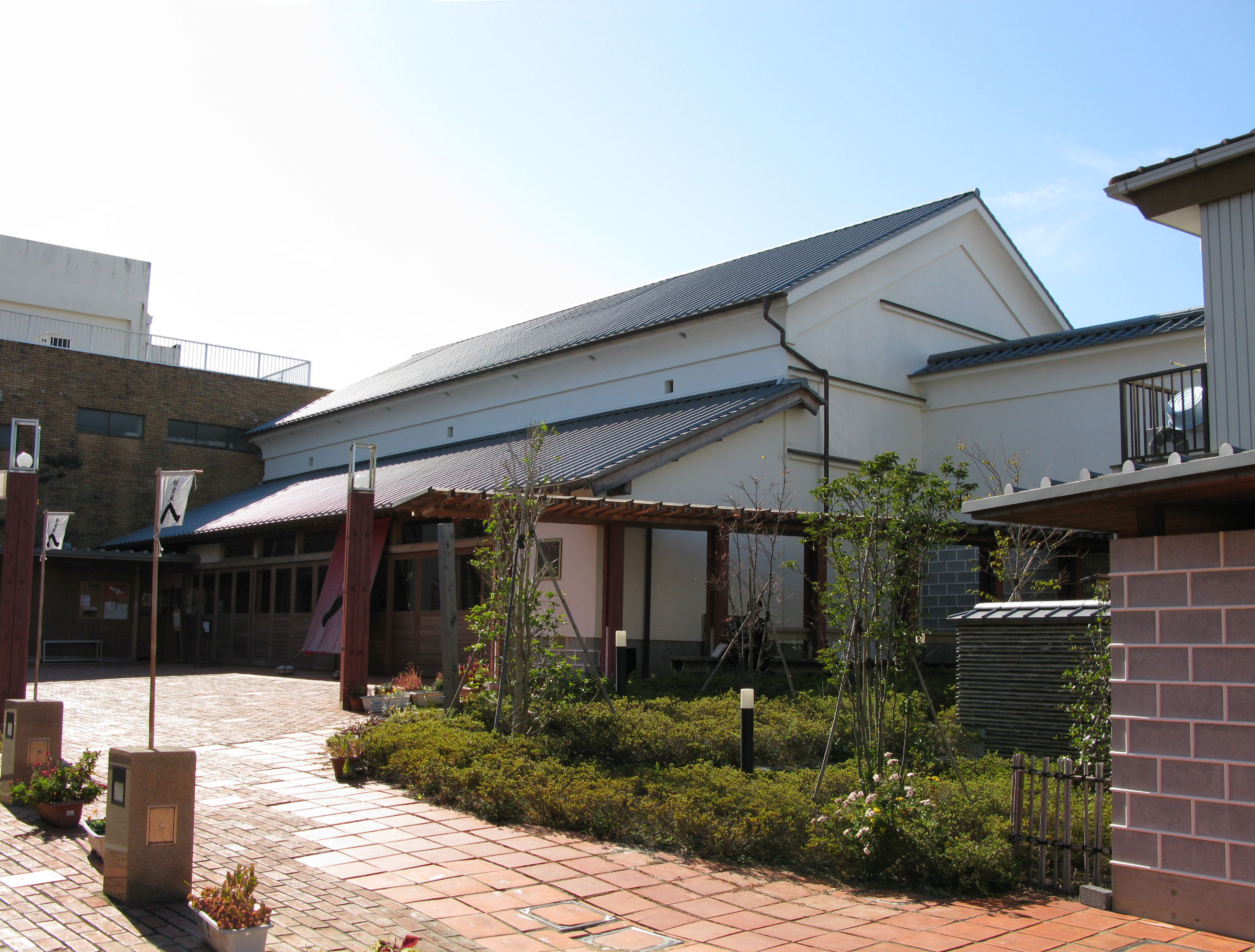
Ekin Museum in Kōnan (33°32′30″N 133°43′28″E)

The Ekin Museum (絵金蔵, Ekin-gura) is located in Kōnan in Kōchi Prefecture. Twenty-three of his Tosa Scenes of Kabuki (土佐芝居絵屏風) are stored in the museum, with two visible through peepholes throughout the year.

== Ekin Festival ==
On the third weekend in July, his folding screens on dramatic subjects are displayed at night by candlelight in the streets of Akaoka in Kōnan.

== See also ==
- List of Cultural Properties of Japan - paintings (Kōchi)
