= Iwamoto-ji =

Buddhist temple in Kōchi Prefecture, Japan

Coordinates: 33.207972°N 133.134611°E

Iwamoto-ji 岩本寺
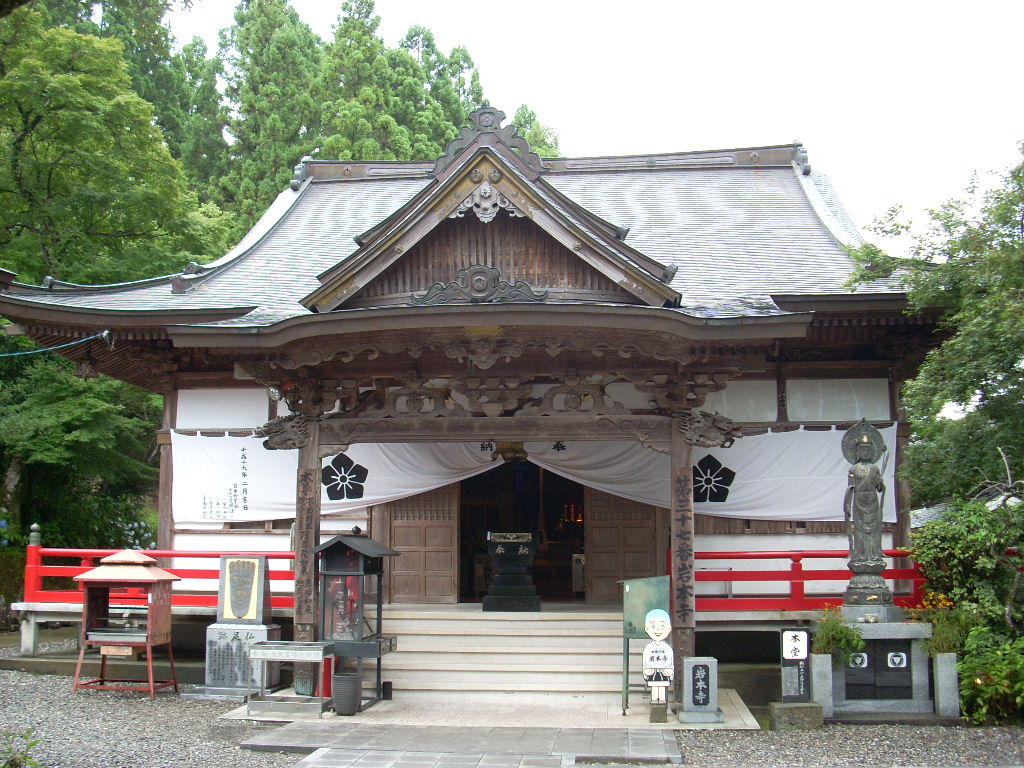
- Hondō of Iwamoto-ji

Religion
- Affiliation: Shingon, Chisan sect
- Deity: Fudō Myō-ō, Shō Kannon, Amida Nyōrai, Yakushi Nyorai, Jizō Bosatsu

Location
- Location: Shimanto, Kōchi-ken
- Country: Japan
- Interactive map of Iwamoto-ji 岩本寺

Architecture
- Founder: Gyōki
- Completed: 729–749

Iwamoto-ji (岩本寺) is a Chisan Shingon temple in Shimanto, Kōchi Prefecture, Japan. Temple 37 on the Shikoku 88 temple pilgrimage, the deities that are worshipped at this temple are Fudō Myō-ō, Shō Kannon, Amida Nyōrai, Yakushi Nyorai, and Jizō Bosatsu. The temple is said to have been founded by Gyōki during 729–749.

== History ==
Gyōki founded Iwamoto-ji in 729 after receiving an imperial command by Emperor Shōmu who had an interest in establishing a system of provincial temples in Japan. He originally built a group of seven temples to represent the seven stars and seven good fortunes described in Ninnō-gyō. Kōbō-Daishi arrived at Shimanto Town in 810 and added five shrines and five temples to the area over a span of 14 years.

Several fires caused by war (1573–1592) burned the temples down and were temporarily closed. During 1652–1688, the temple, now known as Iwamoto-ji, was re-built in a different location than its original temple. The five honzon that survived from the fire at the other temples were permanently moved to Iwamoto-ji in 1889, and still remain on the temple grounds today.

== Buildings ==
- Hondō
- Sanmon: Niōmon (仁王門)
- Shōrō

== See also ==
- Shikoku 88 Temple Pilgrimage
