= Lists of swords =

Lists of swords:

- List of historical swords
- List of Japanese swords
  - List of National Treasures of Japan (crafts: swords)
  - List of Wazamono
- List of mythological swords
- List of fictional swords
- List of types of swords
- Classification of swords
