= Edged and bladed weapons =

Melee weapon with a cutting edge

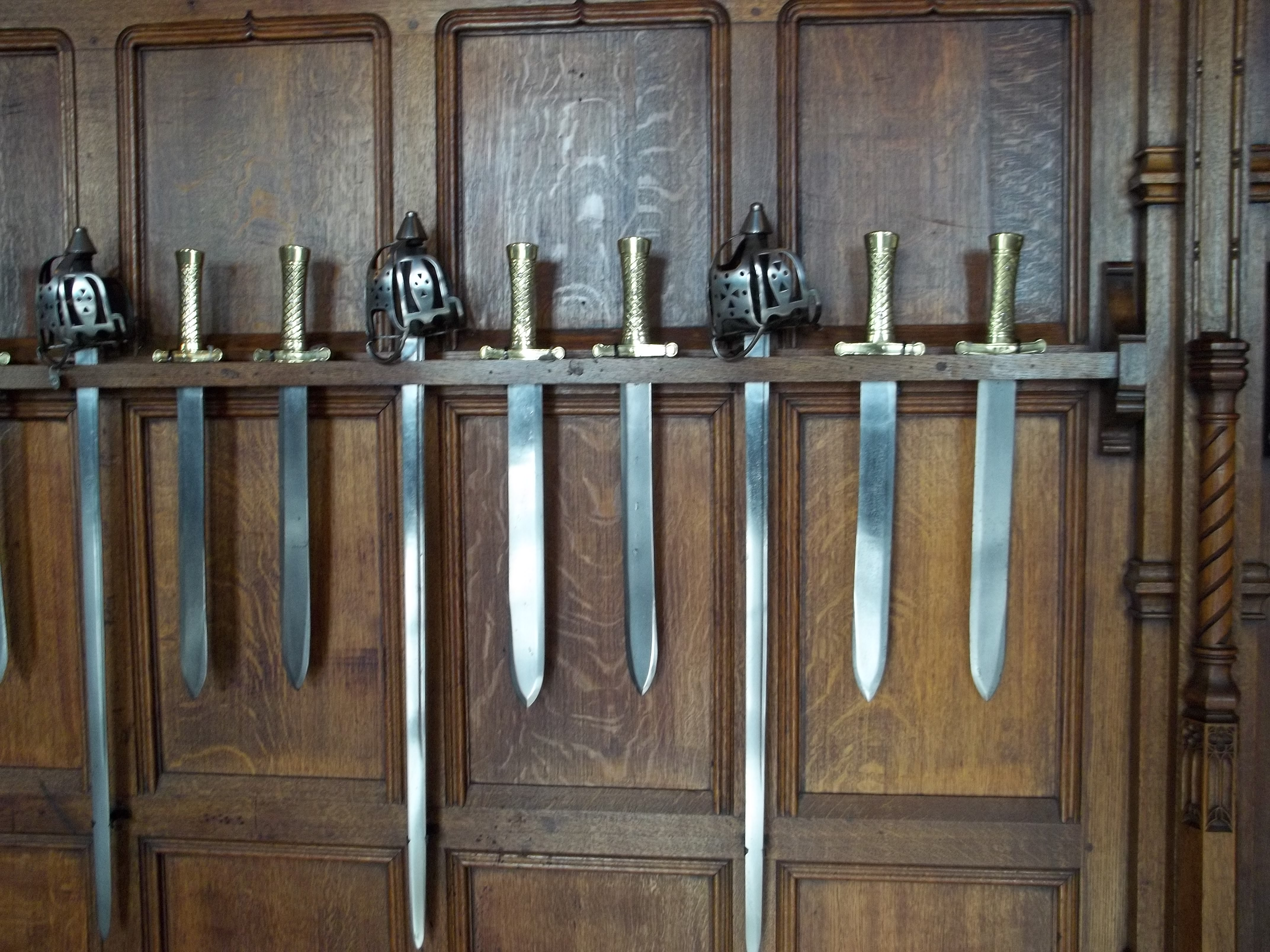
Swords on display in Edinburgh Castle

An edged weapon, or bladed weapon, is a hand-to-hand combat weapon with a cutting edge. Bladed weapons include swords, daggers, knives, and bayonets. Edged weapons are used to cut, hack, or slash; some edged weapons (such as many kinds of swords) may also permit thrusting and stabbing. Edged weapons contrast with blunt weapons such as maces, and with pointed weapons such as spears.

Many edged agricultural tools, such as machetes, hatchets, axes, sickles, sling blades, and scythes, have been used as improvised weapons by peasantry, militia, or irregular forces – particularly as an expedient for defence.

Edged weapons and blades, as well as other cold weapons, are associated with the premodern age but continue to be used in modern armies. Combat knives and knife bayonets are used for close combat or stealth operations and are issued as a secondary arm or sidearm. Modern bayonets are often intended to be used in a dual role as both a combat knife and knife bayonet. Improvised edged weapons were extensively used in trench warfare of the First World War; for example, an entrenching tool might be modified to take an edge and be used as a weapon.

== See also ==
- Lists of swords
- List of medieval weapons
- List of martial arts weapons
