= Sword of Attila =

Legendary weapon of Attila the Hun

The Sword of Attila, also called the Sword of Mars or Sword of God, was the legendary weapon carried by Attila the Hun.

== Attestations ==
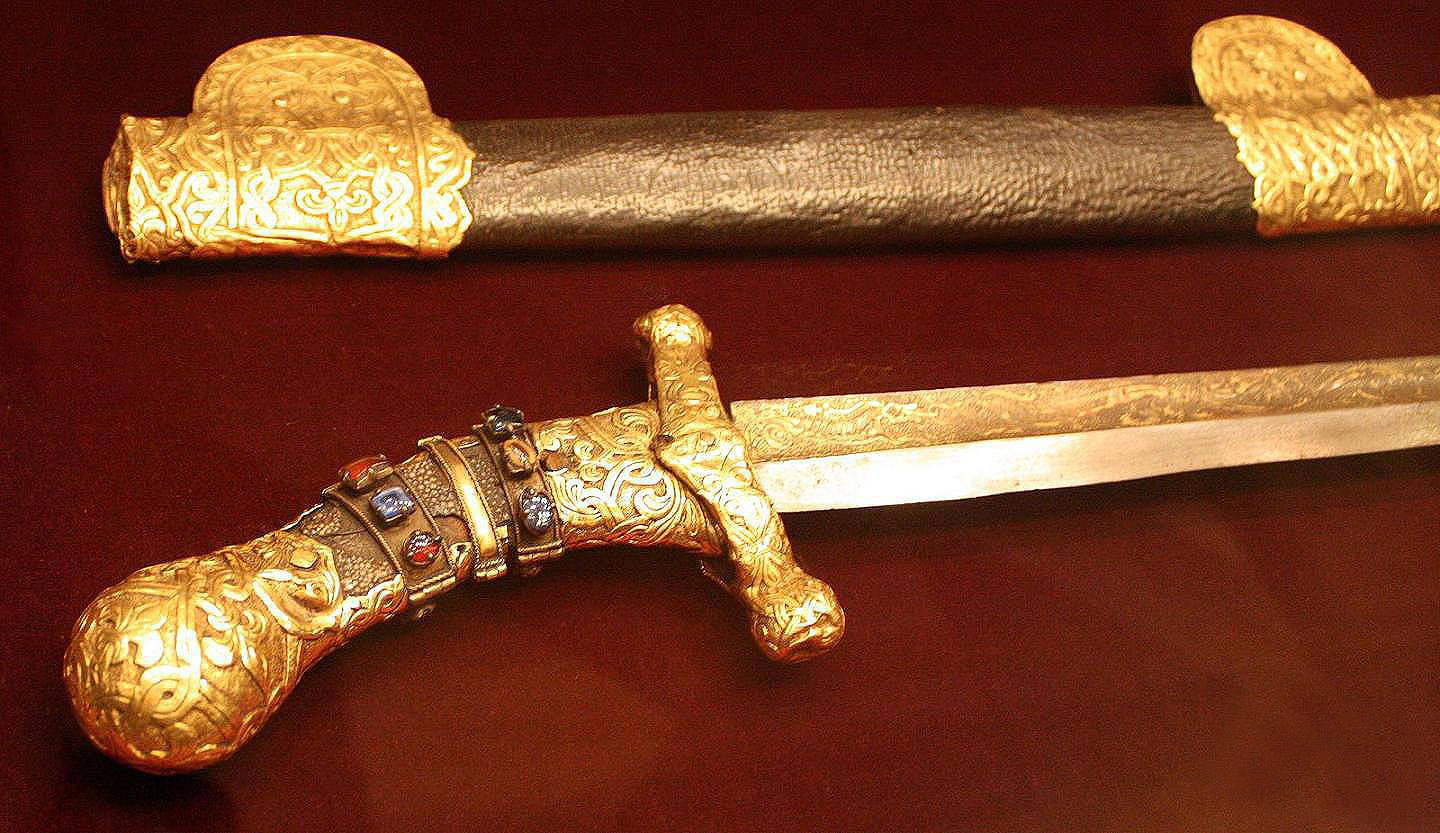
During the reign of King Solomon of Hungary, in the autumn of 1063, Queen Mother Anastasia presented a richly decorated sabre to Otto of Nordheim, Duke of Bavaria. This weapon was esteemed in the Hungarian royal court as the Sword of Attila. The Kunsthistorisches Museum in Vienna named it the Sabre of Charlemagne. Actually a Hungarian sabre from the first half of the 10th century.

The Roman historian Jordanes, quoting the work of the historian Priscus, gave the story of its origin:

When a certain shepherd beheld one heifer of his flock limping and could find no cause for this wound, he anxiously followed the trail of blood and at length came to a sword it had unwittingly trampled while nibbling the grass. He dug it up and took it straight to Attila. He rejoiced at this gift and, being ambitious, thought he had been appointed ruler of the whole world, and that through the sword of Mars supremacy in all wars was assured to him.

The use of "Mars" here is due to the interpretatio romana of Priscus. Hungarian legends refer to it simply as "az Isten kardja", the sword of God. Priscus's description is also notable for describing how Attila used it as both a military weapon and a symbol of divine favor, which may have contributed to his reputation as "the Scourge of God," a divinely-appointed punisher. As historian Edward Gibbon elaborated, "the vigour with which Attila wielded the sword of Mars convinced the world that it had been reserved alone for his invincible arm." In this way it became somewhat of a scepter as well, representing Attila's right to rulership. The Scythians worshipped a god equated with Ares by Herodotus, which has led some authorities to speculate that it was adopted by the Huns.

In the 11th century, some 500 years after the death of Attila, a sword allegedly belonging to him surfaced according to Lambert of Hersfeld, who attributed its provenance to the recently established Árpád kings of Hungary, who in turn appropriated the cult of Attila and linked their claimed descent from him with the right to rule. The Annales of Lambert records that the sword was given by Anastasia, mother of King Solomon of Hungary, to Otto, Duke of Bavaria, in gratitude for helping Solomon ascend to the throne in 1063. Otho had given it to Dedus, younger son of the Margrave Dedus. The king, Henry IV, received it after his death in 1069, giving it to the royal counselor Leopold of Meersburg, whose death in 1071—it was asserted by partisans of his rival, Otho—had been a divine judgment. The occasion of Leopold's unfortunate death was impalement upon his own sword after falling from his horse.

It was recorded that this was the very sword with which Attila, once the most infamous king of the Huns, raged in hostile fury for the murder of Christians and the devastation of Gaul. For the Queen of the Hungarians, the mother of King Solomon, had given it as a gift to Otto, Duke of Bavaria, after her son, through his counsel and exertions, had been restored by the king [Henry IV] to his paternal throne…

— The Annals of Lampert of Hersfeld

There is no evidence to substantiate these medieval claims of its origin with Attila. The sword, now in the Kunsthistorisches Museum of Vienna as part of the Habsburg Schatzkammer, in fact, appears to be from the early 10th century and possibly Hungarian.

The real historical events of the discovery of this sword will probably remain unknown. More information about the possible origin of the sword comes from the Miholjanec locality finding. Before this legend had been regarded, this sword was believed to be Joyeuse, the sword of Charlemagne.

== See also ==
- List of historical swords
