= List of historical swords =

This is a list of notable individual swords, known either from historical record or from surviving artifacts.

== Legendary swords ==
These swords do not survive as artifacts or are not and have not been available for public inspection, and their description may be of doubtful historicity.

=== Asian ===
- Kusanagi-no-tsurugi ("Grass-Cutting Sword", time period disputed), one of the three Imperial Regalia of Japan. Allegedly kept at Atsuta Shrine but is not available for public display. Its existence and origins remain doubtful.
- Thuận Thiên ("Heaven's Will"), the sword of the Lê Lợi, Emperor of Đại Việt from 1428 to 1433.
- Sirohi sword is a traditional Indian blade known for its curved design, sharp edge, and craftsmanship originating from Sirohi, Rajasthan. Historically revered by Rajput warriors, it symbolizes valor, heritage, and martial skill.
- Sword of Victory – One of the Royal Regalia of Thailand
- Zulfiqar, Contrary to popular belief, this sword does not have a scissor-like tip, but a sword that has a backbone behind its blade belonging to Ali, the first Imam from 632 to 661. The sword's location is unknown, but Twelver Muslims regard it as a hereditary cynosure along with other messianic artifacts, including the staff of Moses, the ring of Suleiman, etc., that will identify the twelfth Imam (Muhammad al-Mahdi). The prefix "zul" is a possessive pronoun and "fiqar" means spinal cord.

=== European ===
- Sword of Attila or the Sword of Mars, the sword of Attila the Hun, ruler of the Huns from 434 to 453.
- Colada ("Cast [Steel]"), one of two swords owned by El Cid, the other being Tizona, which is preserved.
- Durandal, purported to be the sword of French military leader Roland. An alleged fragment of Durendal was located in Rocamadour.
- Excalibur, the legendary sword of King Arthur, given to him either from a stone or by the Lady of the Lake, depending on the legend.

==== Norse ====
- Dragvandil, the sword of Egill Skallagrímsson.
- Grásiða, sword in Gísla saga Sursonnar
- Kvernbítr ("Quern-biter"), sword of Haakon I of Norway and his follower, Thoralf Skolinson the Strong, said to be sharp enough to cut through quernstones.
- Leggbítr or Leggbít ("Legbiter"), a gaddhjalt sword of the Magnus Barefoot, viking and King of Norway from 1093 to 1103.
- Mæringr - sword of Björn in Bjarnar saga Hítdœlakappa

==== Slavic ====
- Żuraw or Grus ("Crane"), the sword of Boleslaus III, Duke of Poland from 1107 to 1138. Possibly the same sword as Szczerbiec, which is preserved.

== Artifacts ==
These swords are preserved artifacts, or were previously preserved artifacts that are now lost. Their attribution to historical characters may be doubtful.

=== Asian ===
Chinese

- The Sword of Goujian (5th century BC), personal sword of Goujian, King of Yue. Displayed at the Hubei Provincial Museum.

Japanese

- The "National Treasures" of Japan includes a list of swords of "especially high historical or artistic value".
- The Important Cultural Property of Japan, established in 1950, also includes items, including swords, "judged to be of particular importance to the Japanese people".
  - The Important Works of Fine Arts of Japan, established in 1933, include arts and crafts of significant historical or artistic value, and thus include a great number of swords. The list was abolished in 1950 for the new legislation of Important Cultural Property.
- Shichishitō ("Seven-Branched Sword", time period disputed), which Wa received from Baekje. Kept at the Isonokami Shrine.
- Kogarasu Maru ("Little Crow", 8th-12th century), a unique Japanese tachi sword believed to have been created by legendary Japanese smith Amakuni. In private collection of the Imperial House of Japan.
- Hotarumaru ("Firefly", 1290s), a "national treasure" of Japan, was an ōdachi kept at the Aso Shrine. Lost after World War II.
- Honjo Masamune (13th - 14th century), a "national treasure" of Japan, was crafted by legendary sword-maker Masamune and eventually passed down the Tokugawa shogunate. Lost after World War II.
- Myōhō Muramasa ("Muramasa of the Sublime Dharma", 1513), supposedly crafted by Muramasa and passed down the Nabeshima clan. In private collection.
- Kotetsu (Time period disputed), the personal sword of Shinsengumi leader Kondō Isami, supposedly crafted by Nagasone Kotetsu. However, the sword was thought to be a fake crafted by Minamoto Kiyomaro. Kotetsu can also refer to several different swords crafted by Nagasone Kotetsu.
- Sugari no Ontachi ("The Bee Tachi"), sacred treasure of the Ise Grand Shrine. According to tradition, treasures of the Shrine, along with the Shrine itself, is rebuilt every 20 years. Old copies of the sword were originally buried or burnt, but in modern times they are preserved.
- The Tenka-Goken ("Five [Best] Swords under Heaven"), a group of five famous Japanese swords:
  - Dōjigiri ("Slayer of Shuten-dōji", 10th - 12th century), a "national treasure" of Japan, displayed at the Tokyo National Museum.
  - Mikazuki ("Crescent Moon", 10 - 12th century), a "national treasure" of Japan, displayed at the Tokyo National Museum.
  - Ōtenta ("Great Denta" or "The Best among Swords Forged by Denta", 11th century), a "national treasure" of Japan, in private collection of the Maeda Ikutokukai.
  - Juzumaru ("Rosary", 1261 - 1264), an Important Cultural Property of Japan, owned by Honkōji Temple, Amagasaki.
  - Onimaru ("Demon", 12 - 13th century), in private collection of the Imperial House of Japan.

Southeastern Asia

- Attahasa ("Shiva's Roaring Laughter", time period circa 550 CE) supposedly the sword wielded by the Pushyabhuti King Prabhakaravardhana.
- Cura Si Manjakini ("Blade of the Mandakini", time period disputed), supposedly the sword of Alexander the Great, passed down to the Malay royal house of Perak. Kept as royal regalia of the Perak Sultanate.
- The Phra Saeng Khan Chaiyasi ("Sword of Victory", time period disputed), part of the royal regalia of the King of Thailand. Believed to be an ancient sword from the Khmer Empire, discovered in Thailand during the reign of King Rama I.

Near Eastern

- Sword of Peter (time period disputed), supposedly the Sword of Saint Peter, used by him to cut the ear off a high priest while defending Jesus in Gethsemane, though of uncertain provenance. Pope John XIII sent it to Poland around 968. Displayed at the Poznań Archdiocesan Museum in Poznań.
- Sword of Osman (before 1421), supposedly the sword of Osman I, the founder of the Ottoman Empire. Used as a sword of state by Murad II and all later sultans in their coronation ceremonies. Displayed at the Imperial Treasury section of Topkapı Palace.
- Nader Shah's Sword (time period disputed), supposedly the sword of Nader Shah, Shah of Persia from 1736 to 1747. It was stolen from a local museum in Kubachi, Dagestan in 2017.
- The Nine Swords of Muhammad (between 610 and 632), alleged to belong to Muhammad, the prophet and founder of Islam.
  - Al-’Adb ("Anger" or "Sharp"), given to Muhammad by Saʽd ibn ʽUbadah before the Battle of Badr, and was also used in the Battle of Uhud. Is currently stored at Al-Hussein Mosque in Cairo, Egypt.
  - Al-Ma’thur or Ma’thur al-Fijar, the first sword owned by Muhammad, which he inherited from his father Abdullah ibn Abd al-Muttalib. The sword bears Abdullah's name inscribed on the handle. It was given to ʿAlī ibn Abī Ṭālib, and is currently stored in Topkapi Museum in Istanbul.
  - Ar-Rasub
  - Al-Battar
  - Hatf
  - Qal’i
  - Dhu al-Faqar
  - Al-Mikhdham
  - Al-Qadib

=== European ===
Britain and Ireland

- The Manx Sword of State (15th century), a ceremonial sword used by the parliament of the Isle of Man at the annual Tynwald ceremony. Originally attributed to Olaf the Black. Displayed at the Manx Museum.
- The Scottish Sword of State (1507), part of the Honours of Scotland displayed at the Crown Room of Edinburgh Castle.
- The Sword of Spiritual Justice (early 17th century), probably supplied for the coronation of Charles I in 1626. Displayed at the Jewel House, Tower of London.
- The Sword of Temporal Justice (before 1626), probably supplied for the coronation of Charles I in 1626. Displayed at the Jewel House, Tower of London.
- The Sword of Mercy (c. 1620), part of the Crown Jewels of the United Kingdom, a reproduction of the original, which is now lost. Displayed at the Jewel House, Tower of London.
- The Irish Sword of State (1660), a ceremonial sword of the Kingdom of Ireland. An earlier Irish sword of state was lost after 1581. Displayed at the Jewel House, Tower of London.
- The Sword of State (1678), part of the Crown Jewels of the United Kingdom displayed at the Jewel House, Tower of London.
- The Sword of Offering (1820), part of the Crown Jewels of the United Kingdom displayed at the Jewel House, Tower of London.
- The Wallace Sword (time period disputed), a large sword alleged to have been used by Scottish patriot and knight William Wallace. Displayed at the Wallace Monument.
- The Prince of Wales's Investiture Sword (1911), designed for the investiture of Prince Edward (later Edward VIII and subsequently Duke of Windsor), and also used for the investiture of Prince Charles in 1969. Part of the Honours of the Principality of Wales and held by the Royal Collection. An earlier investiture sword from Tudor times was used before 1911.
- Guy of Warwick's sword (time period disputed), reputedly belonged to the legendary Guy of Warwick who is said to have lived in the 10th century. Displayed at Warwick Castle.

Western Europe

- Joyeuse ("Joyous", 13th - 19th century), the coronation sword of the kings of France, named after and purportedly attributed to be the historical sword "Joyeuse" of Charlemagne. Displayed at the Louvre.
- The Dutch Rijkszwaard ("Sword of State", 1840), manufactured during the reign of William II.

Iberia

- Tizona (period disputed), purported to be El Cid's personal sword, displayed at the Museum of Burgos.
- Lobera ("Wolf-Slayer", 1248), the sword of the Saint Ferdinand III of Castile. Kept at the Seville Cathedral.

Northern Europe

- The Swedish Rikssvärdet ("Sword of State", 1541) and the "äldre rikssvärdet" (Older Sword of State, before 1541), personal swords of Gustav I of Sweden. Part of the Regalia of Sweden displayed at the Stockholm Palace.
- The Crown Prince's Sword (1620), presented to the Treasury in 1810 by King Charles XIII of Sweden to be used as a crown prince's sword. Part of the Regalia of Sweden displayed at the Stockholm Palace.
- King Gustav III's King's Sword (1772), commissioned by King Gustav III of Sweden for his coronation. Part of the Regalia of Sweden displayed at the Stockholm Palace.
- Christian III's sword of state (1551), part of the Danish Crown Regalia displayed at the Rosenborg Castle.
- The Danish Kroningskården ("Anointing Sword", 1643), part of the Danish Crown Regalia displayed at the Rosenborg Castle.
- The Norwegian Rikssverdet ("Sword of State", 19th century), part of the Regalia of Norway. Personal sword of Jean Bernadotte who was later crowned as Charles XIV John of Sweden. Displayed at the Archbishop's Palace, Trondheim. An earlier sword of state was lost after 1537.

Central Europe

- The Sword of Saints Cosmas and Damian (10th century), thought to have been a gift by Otto III, Holy Roman Emperor to the Essen Abbey. Displayed at the Essen Cathedral Treasury.
- The Sabre of Charlemagne (early 10th century), an early sabre of Hungarian (Magyar) type falsely reputed to have belonged to the ruler Charlemagne. Displayed at the Imperial Treasury, Vienna.
- The Sword of Saint Wenceslas (10th - 13th century), a ceremonial sword used in the Kingdom of Bohemia during coronation ceremonies in Prague. Displayed as part of the Treasury of St. Vitus Cathedral at the Prague Castle.
- The Reichsschwert ("Imperial Sword", 12th century) of the Holy Roman Empire, part of the Imperial Regalia displayed at the Imperial Treasury, Vienna.
- Szczerbiec ("The Notched [Sword]", 13th century), the coronation sword of the kings of Poland. Displayed at the Wawel Castle.
- The Sword of Scanderbeg (15th century), alleged to be the sword of Albanian nobleman Skanderbeg, displayed at the Kunsthistorisches Museum.
- The Grunwald swords (Before 1410), once part of the Polish Crown Jewels, lost in 1853.
- The Sigismuntus Iustus ("[Sword of] Justice of Sigismund", c. 1520), sword of King Sigismund I the Old. Displayed at the Wawel Castle.
- The ceremonial sword of Stanisław August Poniatowski (1764), sword of King Stanisław II Augustus. Displayed at the Royal Castle, Warsaw.
- The execution sword of Katte, supposedly an executioner's sword used to behead Hans Hermann von Katte. There are two swords purporting to be the genuine sword:
  - The execution sword of Katte (18th century), kept at the City Museum of Brandenburg until 2014, when the sword was returned to the von Katte family.
  - The executioner's sword with scabbard (17th - 18th century), kept by the Stadtmuseum Berlin Foundation.

Southern Europe

- The Sword of Saint Galgano (12th century), a medieval sword said to be of San Galgano embedded in a stone, located at the Montesiepi Chapel near the Abbey of San Galgano in Siena, Italy.
- The Sword of Islam, a ceremonial melee weapon given in 1937 to Benito Mussolini, who was pronounced as the Protector of Islam. Lost in 1943.
- The Sword and Spurs of Giampietro de Proti, medieval artifacts owned by the Italian politician and military figure

Russia

- The hunting sword of Michael I (1617), part of the regalia of the Russian tsars on display at the Moscow Kremlin Museums.
- The Sabre of Michael I (16th century), part of the regalia of the Russian tsars on display at the Moscow Kremlin Museums.
- The Koncerz of Alexis I (1657), part of the regalia of the Russian tsars on display at the Moscow Kremlin Museums.
- The Sword of State (late 17th century), made during the reign of Peter the Great. Displayed at the Moscow Kremlin Museums.
- The Sword of Stalingrad (1943), a ceremonial longsword presented by command of King George VI of the United Kingdom to Marshall Joseph Stalin in 1943 as a token of homage from the British people to the Soviet defenders of the city during the Battle of Stalingrad.

=== North American ===
- The Sword of State of South Carolina (1951), symbol of the South Carolina Senate, presented to South Carolina by the Earl of Halifax.
  - The original Sword of State of South Carolina (early 18th century) was used from 1704 to 1941, when it was stolen.
  - A replacement Sword of State of South Carolina (1800) was used between 1941 and 1951. It was a cavalry sword from the Charleston Museum and was used in the War of 1812 and the American Civil War.

=== South American ===
- The Curved Saber of San Martín (before 1811), the sword of General Don José de San Martín, one of the great libertadores of South America. Displayed at the National Historical Museum, Argentina.
- The Sword of Simón Bolívar, originally kept at Quinta de Bolívar in Colombia until its theft in 1974 by the guerrilla group M-19. The sword was returned in 1991, but its authenticity afterwards has been called into question. It has been kept in a vault in the Bank of the Republic in Bogotá after its return. In 2011, the guerrilla group FARC claimed to be in possession of the real sword, although this was denied by the Colombian government.

== See also ==
- List of mythical objects
- List of fictional swords
