= Nagasone Kotetsu =

Japanese swordsmith

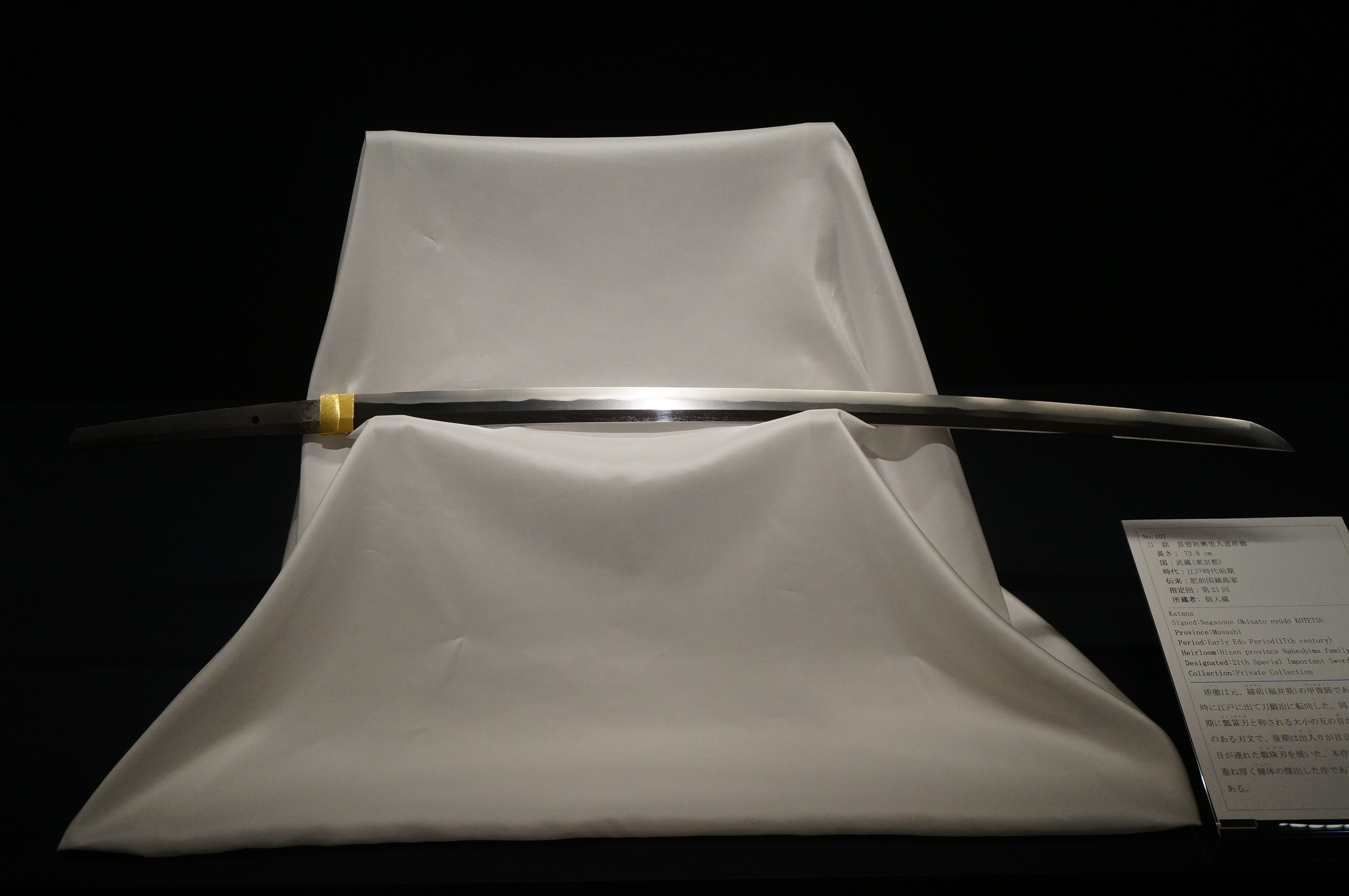
Nagasone Kotetsu, rated as Saijo Ō Wazamono, was one of the most popular swordsmiths in the Edo period. A katana, Nabeshima Kotetsu. (owned by Nabeshima clan)

Nagasone Kotetsu (長曾禰 虎徹; c. 1597 – June 24, 1678) (born Nagasone Okisato) was a Japanese swordmaker of the early Edo period. His father was an armorer who served Ishida Mitsunari, the lord of Sawayama. However, as Ishida was defeated by Tokugawa Ieyasu at the Battle of Sekigahara, the Nagasone family and some other craftsmen from Sawayama went to Echizen Province, where they took refuge in Fukui City.

== Early history ==
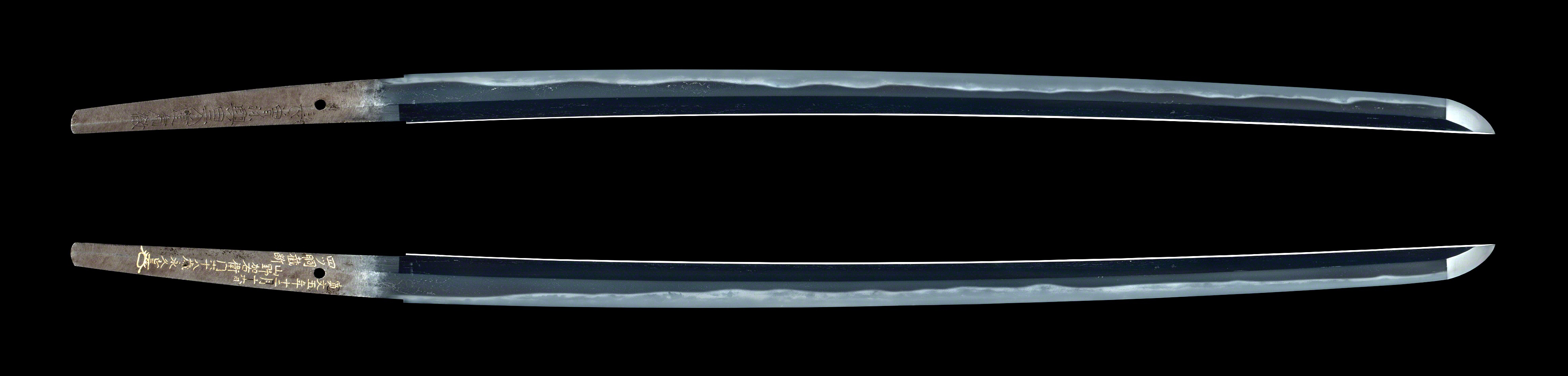
Katana forged by Nagasone Kotetsu. The letters inlaid with gold on the tang (nakago) indicated that Yamano Kauemon (山野加右衛門), the official executioner of the Tokugawa shogunate and examiner of sword cutting performance, cut the four human torso overlapped.

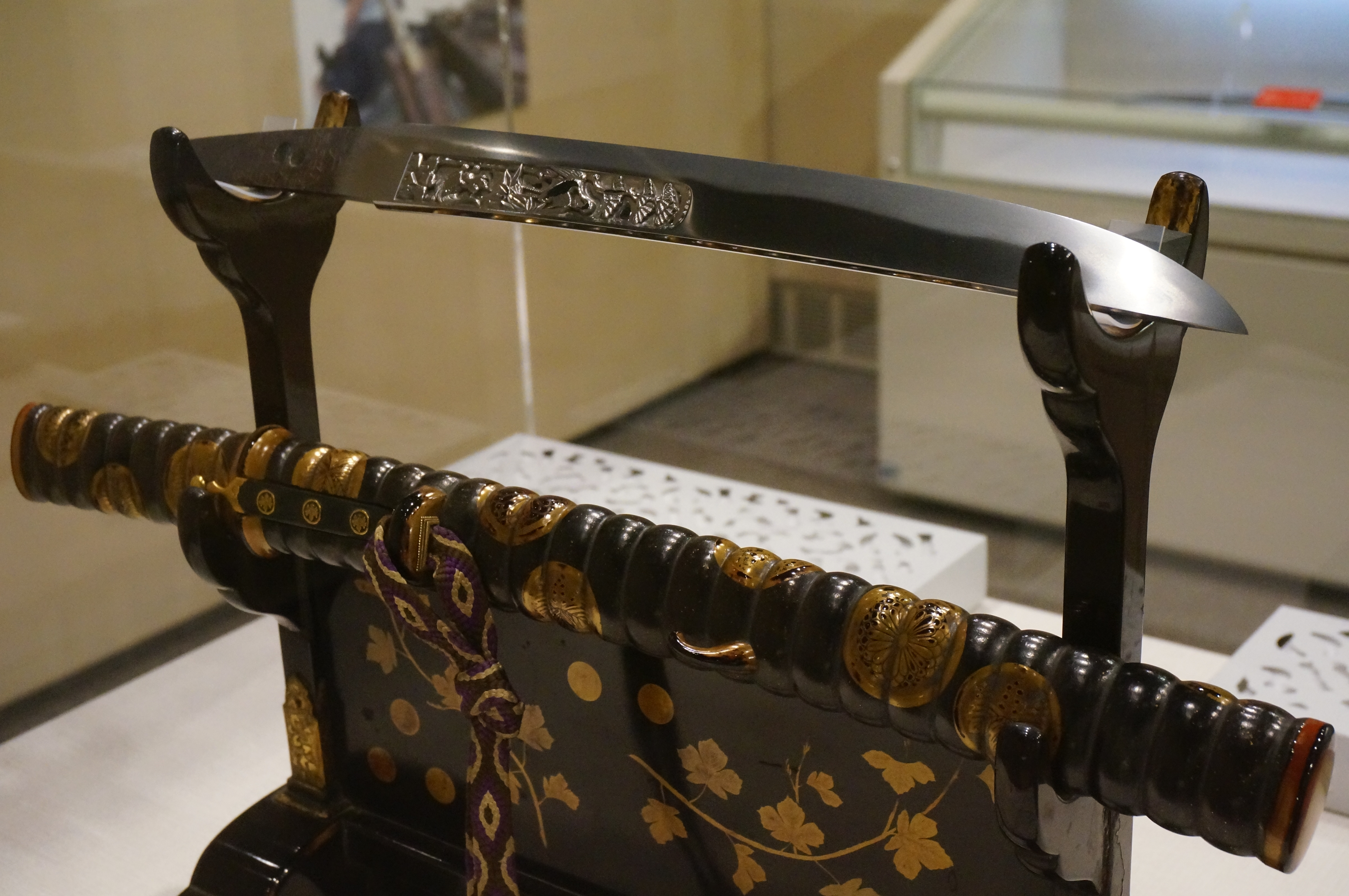
A tantō, Hōraisan Kotetsu.

Nagasone Okisato (長曽祢興里) was born in Nagasone-mura, Ōmi Province. The Nagasone family were blacksmiths and produced armor. Kotetsu would continue the family's tradition by becoming an armorer, but moved to Edo to pursue a career in swordmaking around the age of 50.

Kotetsu's swords were known for their great strength and their ability to cut through helmets. However, Kotetsu's swords were often faked, and they were so well faked that even Kotetsu himself is said to have not been able to tell the difference. When presented with a fake on one occasion, he is reported to have said "The blade is mine but the signature is not." Records exist which state that Nagasone Kotetsu only forged thirty one swords bearing the name. There are however other records which directly dispute this, with the Nihontô Meikan showing 50 different mei or signatures for Nagasone Kotetsu. Additionally, there are Honomi records of sword polishers and master appraisers receiving Mumei or unsigned blades from Nagasone Kotetsu, and adding signature to them later after having completely substantiated the maker and provenance of the sword in question, increasing this count even further. This can also easily explain Kotetsu's comment above where he said - "The blade is mine, but the signature is not." However, the fact remains that Kotetsu has been often faked over the past 350+ years, and so both the signatures as well as the style and quality of the blade should be judged closely to determine accuracy.

== Fake sword ==
Perhaps one of the most famed Kotetsu blades was a fake: that of Kondō Isami, the commander of the late Edo-era patrol force called Shinsengumi. However, this sword was not a Kotetsu, but instead a sword made by the foremost smith of that era (known in Japanese swordmaking history as the shinshin-to era), Minamoto Kiyomaro, and bearing a forged Kotetsu signature made by master signature-faker Hosoda Heijirō.

== Name change ==
Nagasone Okisato took the name Kotetsu upon taking the Buddhist tonsure in Edo, at Kan'eiji Temple, in the Ueno district. He was active in the Kantō Region for some time, as well as in Edo itself, dying in 1678. Two of his most prominent students and successors were Nagasone Okinao and Nagasone Okihisa.

== Popular uses ==
"Kotetsu" is used as a name for swords in various anime, manga, and video game series, such as Vagabond, Rurouni Kenshin, Kimetsu no Yaiba, One Piece and Black Cat.

The Kōtetsu (formerly the Confederate warship CSS Stonewall) was a Japanese navy ironclad in the Boshin War.

== Kotetsu II ==
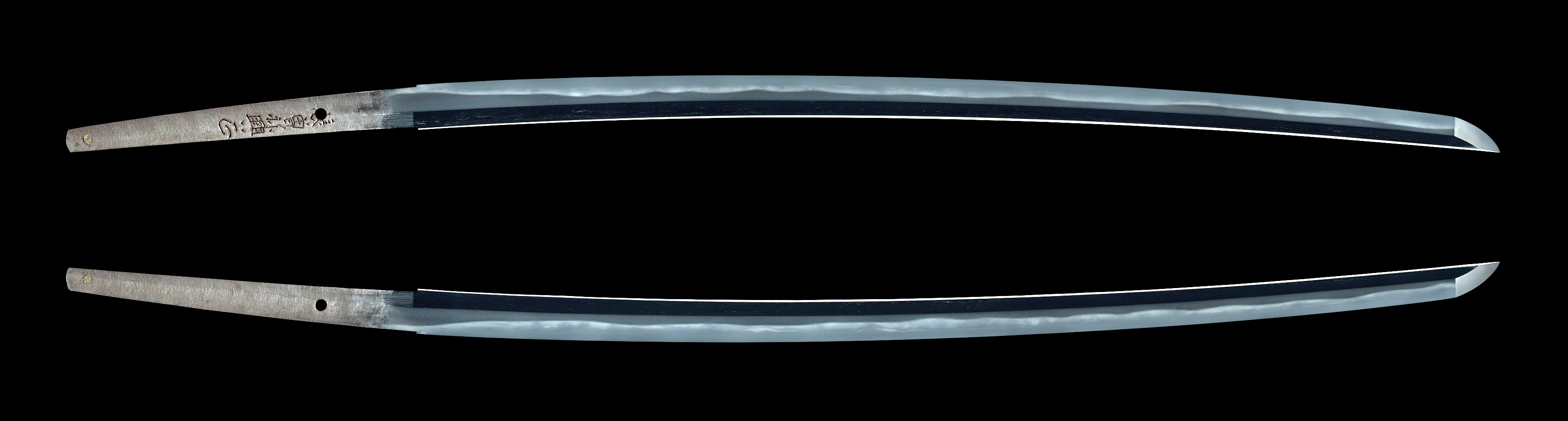
Katana forged by Nagasone Okimasa. Tokyo Fuji Art Museum.

Nagasone Okimasa, the adopted or biological son of Nagasone Okisato, is often called Kotetsu II. He is also rated as the Saijo Ō Wazamono.

== Bibliography ==
- Yasu Kizu, Swordsmith Nagasone Kotetsu Okisato, Hollywood: W.M. Hawley Publications, 1990. ISBN 0-910704-07-4
