= List of fictional swords =

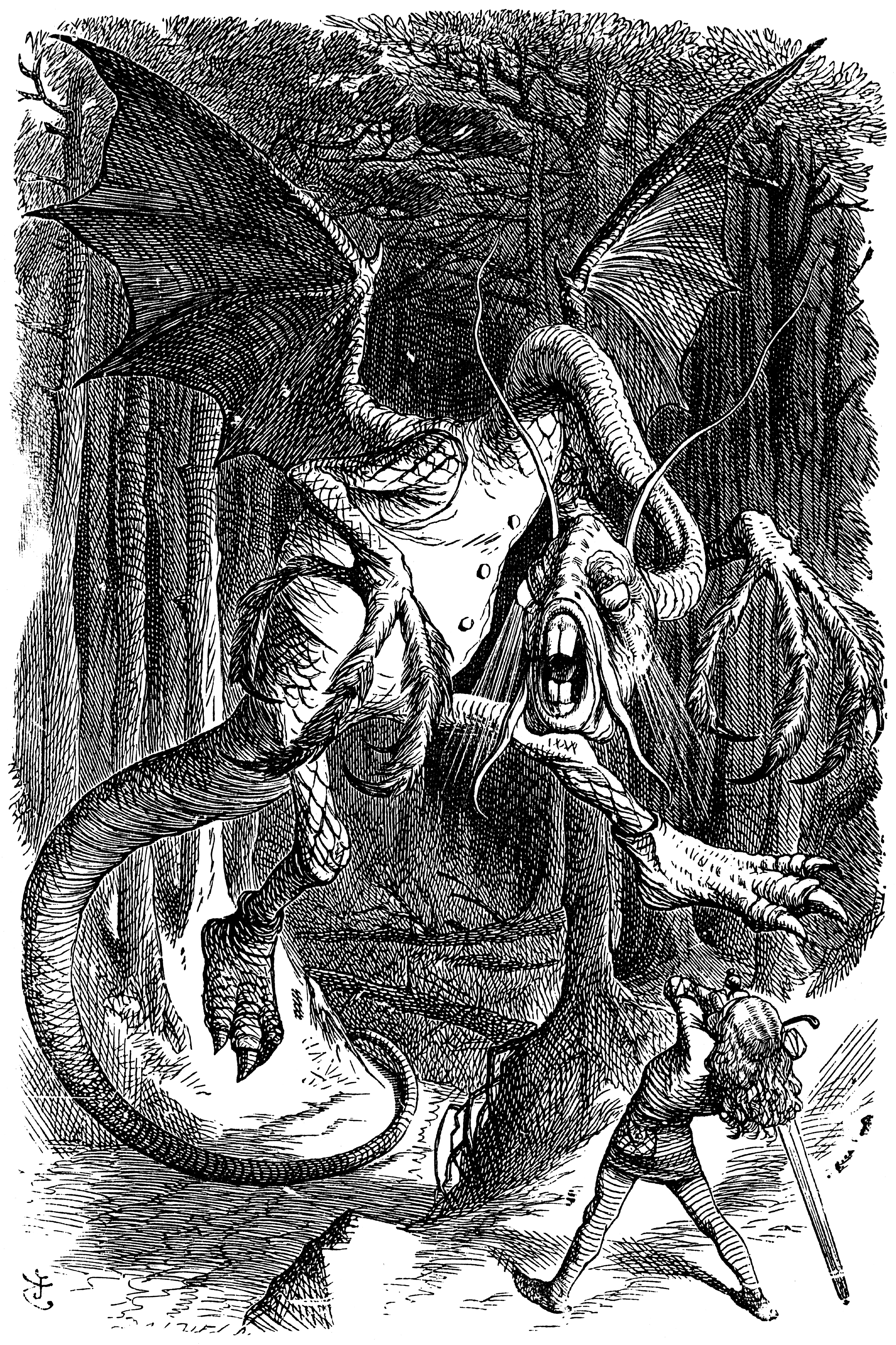
The slaying of the Jabberwock with a vorpal sword.

This article is a list of fictional swords in literature, film and television. For swords originating in mythology and legend, see list of mythological swords. Swords that originate in epic poems, tales and chronicles that were taken at one time as a "true" accounting of history rather than being composed as works of fiction, such as Beowulf, The Tale of the Heike and the Kojiki are not listed here, regardless of whether the swords themselves are believed by contemporary scholars to have existed historically.

== Akita Yoshinobu: Sorcerous Stabber Orphen ==
- Baldanders: The sword of Heavenly Beings, used for transforming a Killing Doll into a humanlike body, males into females, and humans into beasts. The name is of German etymology: "bald anders" means "soon to be different".

== Lloyd Alexander: The Chronicles of Prydain ==
- Dyrnwyn: Prince Gwydion's sword, made by Govannion the Lame under the command of King Rhydderch Hael.

== J.M. Barrie: Peter Pan ==
- Johnny Corkscrew: Smee's cutlass, so named because he would twist it into the wound after stabbing his opponents.

== Terry Brooks: The Sword of Shannara ==
- The Sword of Leah: A sword wielded by the Leah family for generations, which later gains the ability to cut through magic.
- The Sword of Shannara: An indestructible sword forged from magic, which can reveal the truth of any being or situation.

== Lewis Carroll: Jabberwocky ==
- Vorpal Sword: A blade used by the hero to battle and kill the titular beast. Vorpal swords have appeared in various role-playing games: in Dungeons & Dragons, vorpal swords have the ability to sever heads.

== Cassandra Clare: The Shadowhunter Chronicles ==
- Seraph Blades: Swords forged by the Iron Sisters and wielded by shadowhunters to kill demons. They have angelic powers and operate when an angel's name is called.
- Glorious: The sword of the archangel Michael, used by Joshua at Jericho.
- Cortana: A sword passed down through the Carstairs family. It has an inscription on the blade that reads: "I am Cortana, of the same steel and temper as Joyeuse and Durendel."
- Heosphorous and Phaesphoros: The Morgenstern blades. Heosphorous is a short sword made of black steel with a decal of stars inscribed on the blade, while Phaesphoros is a longsword.
- Maellartach: One of the Mortal Instruments given to the Nephilim by the Angel Raziel, which has a guard that resembles a golden pair of wings and is said to be the blade used to drive Adam and Eve from the Garden of Eden. It is also known as The Mortal Sword, the Soul Sword, and the Angel Blade.

== Susan Cooper: The Dark is Rising Sequence ==
- The Crystal Sword: A magical sword commissioned by the Light and crafted in the magical Lost Lands by the Lost King. It is named Eirias, or "blazing", and also called the sword of the sunrise. It burns with blue fire in the presence of the Dark, can cut portals through magical barriers, and is encased in a magical scabbard of invisibility. It is used by Bran Davies, the Pendragon, heir of King Arthur, to cut the fully blossomed silver flower on the Midsummer's Tree.

== Brian Daley: Coramonde ==
- Flarecore: The royal sword of the ruler of the Kingdom of Coramonde, which is plundered from and later returned to Vegana. Also known as Blazetongue, it can be made to ignite if the wielder knows the activating spell. This ability is usually restricted to the ruler, although the evil sorcerer Yardiff Bey also knows the spell.
- Bar: The true weapon of the rulers of Coramonde, which has the property of being eternally sharp.
- Dirge: The sword of the evil wizard Yard Bey. Wounds caused by it do not heal.

== David Eddings: The Belgariad & The Malloreon ==
- The Sword of the Rivan King / Iron-Grip's Sword: The sword of protagonist Garion/Belgarion, which has The Orb of Aldur in the pommel.
- Cthrek Goru / The Sword of Shadows: The sword wielded by the god Torak.

== Michael Ende: The Neverending Story ==
- Sikanda: A sword given to Bastian by Grograman, which only those who have eaten, drunk, and bathed in the flames of the Many-Colored Death and ridden on his back may touch. Sikanda may only be used when it emerges from its sheath of its own volition, as drawing it intentionally brings misfortune.

== Steven Erikson: Malazan Book of the Fallen ==
- Dragnipur: A long, silver-hilted bastard sword with an inky-black blade that absorbs all light. It was wielded by Draconus, who forged it, then Anomander Rake.
- Chance: A sword dedicated to Oponn. It was originally wielded by Ganoes Paran, who gave it to Cotillion when he deemed that any luck it provided him had turned. It is later wielded by Crokus Younghand.
- Vengeance / Grief: A sword commissioned and wielded by Anomander Rake, who named it "Vengeance". When Rake acquired Dragnipur, he passed Vengeance to his brother Andarist, who named it "Grief".

== David Gemmell: Drenai Series ==
- The Swords of Night and Day: Swords wielded by Olek Skilgannon 'the Damned' in White Wolf and The Swords of Night and Day, which are copies of the Swords of Blood and Fire.
- The Swords of Blood and Fire: Twin swords wielded by Decado in The Swords of Night and Day and by Boranius in White Wolf. They are the original swords from which the Swords of Night and Day were copied.
- Snaga: An axe known as Snaga, The Sender, The Blades of No Return. After Druss exorcises the demon from it, it is later used to imbue Gorben's sword with similar powers as the axe, causing Gorben to go insane.

== Terry Goodkind: The Sword of Truth ==
- The Sword of Truth: A sword wielded by Richard Rahl. It possesses various powers, most notably that it opposes being used on a target the wielder does not believe deserves to die, punishes its user after they have killed someone with it, especially someone who did not deserve to die, and remembers the skills of its previous wielders. If given to someone not worthy of the sword, it will eventually transform them into a subhuman creature if it is removed from their possession for an extended period of time.

== Hideki Kamiya: Devil May Cry ==
- Alastor/Force Edge: The depowered form of the sword of Sparda, one of the three swords created by the devil Sparda.
- Dante: The most recent sword of protagonist Dante, which takes his name and he can summon at will.
- Rebellion: Dante's original sword and one of the three swords created by Sparda, which has the ability to combine.
- Red Queen: An engine-powered sword wielded by Nero, the son of Vergil.
- Sparda: The sword wielded by Dante and Vergil's father, which is considered the most powerful sword out of the three created by Sparda.
- Yamato: Vergil's katana-like sword and one of the three swords, which has the ability to separate.

== Robert A. Heinlein: Glory Road ==
- The Lady Vivamus: A straight sabre that resembles a rapier and is used by Oscar Gordon in his mission to recover The Egg of the Phoenix.

== Brian Jacques: Redwall ==
- Sword of Martin: Wielded by Martin the Warrior and numerous successors. Originally an ordinary blade, it was broken by the wildcat queen Tsarmina Greeneyes while Martin was held captive. It was later reforged in the mountain fortress Salamandastron from a chunk of a meteorite, giving it an infinitely hard blade. When Martin retired from the life of a warrior, he hid the sword within Redwall Abbey, with his spirit guiding individuals he deems worthy to wield it. It was named "Ratdeath" by Abbot Mortimer after Matthias slew Cluny the Scourge.
- Verminfate: A broadsword wielded by the badger lord Rawnblade Widestripe.
- Rapscallion sword: Wielded by the Firstblade of the Rapscallion Army. One side of the blade was wavy, to convey the oceans, the other flat, to convey land—when thrown in the air, whatever side it landed on dictated how the army would travel. Gormad Tunn and his son, Damug Warfang, both rigged the hilt with a brass clip to ensure that the sword would land the way they wanted it to. It was broken in battle when Damug was slain by the badger lady Cregga Rose Eyes.

== Robert Jordan: The Wheel of Time ==
- Callandor: A powerful sa'angreal, also known as The Sword that is not a Sword. It resides in the Stone of Tear (heart of the stone)
- Heron Mark Sword: Swords borne by blademasters. Some are Power-wrought blades of Aes Sedai make, and thus unbreakable.

== Fritz Leiber: Fafhrd and the Grey Mouser ==
- Graywand: The longsword wielded by the barbarian Fafhrd.
- Scalpel: The Gray Mouser's thin-bladed rapier, often wielded in conjunction with Cat's Claw, his "hooked dirk".

== C.S. Lewis: The Chronicles of Narnia ==
- Rhindon: Peter Pevensie's sword, which is given to him, along with a shield, by Father Christmas. He uses it to slay the wolf Maugrim and wields it in battle against The White Witch. When the Pevensie children return to Narnia centuries later, he takes it up again to lead the revolutionary army against the Telmarines.

== George R.R. Martin: A Song of Ice and Fire ==
- Blackfyre: The Valyrian steel sword of Aegon I Targaryen. It was wielded by Targaryen kings, with Aegon IV giving it to his son, Daemon Blackfyre. After Daemon led a rebellion against the Targaryens and took the sword's name for his house, its whereabouts are currently unknown.
- Brightroar: The ancestral Valyrian steel greatsword of House Lannister, which was lost when King Tommen II Lannister of the Rock sailed to Valyria and never returned.
- Dark Sister: The Valyrian steel longsword, which was wielded by Visenya Targaryen and Bloodraven.
- Dawn: The ancestral greatsword of House Dayne, who bestowed the title Sword of the Morning upon the sword's bearer. Forged of metal from the heart of a fallen star, it is 'pale as milk glass' and is said to be as sharp as Valyrian steel. It was brought to Ashara Dayne by Eddard Stark after Ser Arthur Dayne's death.
- Hearteater: A sword which was given to Joffrey Baratheon to replace the lost Lion's Tooth. The pommel is a ruby cut in the shape of a heart between a lion's jaws.
- Heartsbane: The ancestral Valyrian steel two-handed greatsword of House Tarly, which is currently in the possession of Lord Randyll Tarly.
- Ice: The ancestral Valyrian steel two-handed greatsword of House Stark. Following Eddard Stark's execution in King's Landing, it was melted down and reforged into two longswords: Widow's Wail and Oathkeeper.
- Lady Forlorn: The ancestral Valyrian steel sword of House Corbray, it is currently in the possession of Ser Lyn Corbray.
- Lightbringer: The sword of Azor Ahai, a legendary hero who is prophesied to drive away the Great Other. Thought to be a sword made of living fire, it is also known as the Red Sword of Heroes.
- Lion's Tooth: Joffrey Baratheon's first sword.
- Longclaw: The ancestral Valyrian steel sword of House Mormont. It once had a bear's head for the pommel, which was replaced by a wolf's head made from pale stone and with chips of garnet for the eyes to reflect Jon Snow's Stark heritage.
- Needle: A small Braavos sword forged in Winterfell for Arya Stark by Mikken at the request of Jon Snow.
- Nightfall: The ancestral Valyrian steel blade of House Harlaw, which is currently wielded by Ser Harras Harlaw.
- Oathkeeper: One of two Valyrian blades reforged by Tobho Mott from ice. It was made for Ser Jaime Lannister, who gave it to Brienne of Tarth for use in her quest to locate Sansa Stark, after which it was given its name, Oathkeeper.
- Red Rain: The Valyrian steel sword of House Drumm, which was stolen in a raid. At that time, it was given its name and coloring, possibly the ancestral sword of House Reyne.
- Widow's Wail: One of two Valyrian blades reforged by Tobho Mott from ice. It was made for King Joffrey Baratheon as a wedding gift by his grandfather, Lord Tywin.

== Michael Moorcock: Eternal Champion ==
- The Black Blade: Urlik Skarsol's sword.
- Kanajana: Erekosë's sword.
- Mournblade: A sword that is Stormbringer's twin, wielded by Elric's cousin, Yyrkoon.
- Ravenbrand: Ulric von Bek's sword.
- Stormbringer: Elric's sword, which absorbs the souls of those it kills.
- The Sword of the Dawn: Dorian Hawkmoon's sword.
- Traitor: Corum Jhaelen Irsei's sword.

== Christopher Paolini: The Inheritance Cycle ==
- Brisingr: Eragon's Dragon Rider's sword, which was crafted for him by the elf Rhunön. It is a blue sword with the glyph for "fire" engraved in the blade and scabbard, with a sapphire in the pommel surrounded by four ribs. When Eragon says its name, it becomes engulfed in blue flames. It is capable of cutting through magical wards.
- Zar'roc: The sword of Dragon Rider Morzan. After his death, Brom kept it for safekeeping before eventually giving it to Eragon. At the Second Battle of the Burning Plains, Murtagh takes it from Eragon, claiming it as his own. It is a crimson sword with a ruby in the pommel.
- Albitr: The sword of Angela, the herbalist, which she nicknamed "Tinkledeath" for the sound it made. It is described as "the ultimate embodiment of an incline plane" and its blade was made of a transparent substance. Angela claims that it is the sharpest sword in the world.
- Arvindr: The sword of a deceased dragon rider, which was considered as a possible replacement weapon for Eragon before Brisingr was forged.
- Naegling: Oromis' gold-bronze sword. During their time in Du Weldenvarden, he and his dragon Glaedr stored vast amounts of energy into the sword's gem, a yellow diamond. Several elves also contributed energy, to the point where there was said to be enough raw power contained within the sword to shift an entire mountain. Oromis used the sword in his duel with Eragon before losing it during his battle with Murtagh. He placed magical wards around it, preventing Oromis from retrieving it and leading to his death.
- Támerlein: A two-handed sword, with its pommel containing an emerald and the inscription "I am Támerlein, bringer of the final sleep" engraved in its blade. It originally belonged to the Elven Dragon Rider Arva, who gave it to his sister, Naudra, to defend herself when Galbatorix and the Forsworn attacked their homeland. When Eragon found himself in need of a new Rider's sword, he sought permission to use the blade as his own. However, he ultimately rejected it and the sword was reworked for Arya, the Queen of the Elves, to use.
- Undbitr: The Rider's sword of Brom, which was lost during The Fall of the Dragon Riders.
- Vrangr: Originally wielded by Vrael, the last leader of the Dragon Riders, and called Islingr, or "light bringer". After Galbatorix killed Vrael, he claimed it for himself and renamed it Vrangr, which translated to "Awry" in the ancient language. Its blade, guard and hilt are pure white, resembling the color "of a sun-bleached bone". An unspecified gem as clear as a mountain spring rests in the pommel.

== Rick Riordan: Percy Jackson and the Olympians and Heroes of Olympus ==
- Anaklusmos: Meaning riptide in English, it is the sword of Percy Jackson, which was given to Hercules by the hesperide Zoe. It is made of the fictional metal Celestial Bronze.
- Backbiter: The sword of Luke Castellan, which is made of Celestial Bronze and regular mortal steel.
- Ivlivs: The sword of Jason Grace, which is made of Imperial Gold and was wielded by Julius Cesar before being destroyed by the giants.
- Katoptris: Meaning Looking Glass in English, it is the dagger of Piper McLean and once belonged to Helen of Troy, who received it as a gift from Menelaus. It allows Piper to see visions of the future.

== J. K. Rowling: Harry Potter ==
- Sword of Gryffindor: The sword of Godric Gryffindor, one of the founders of Hogwarts, which is also wielded by Harry and Neville. It was made by goblins and, though they have ownership over it, it can only be wielded by a "true Gryffindor". The sword absorbs any substance that will strengthen it; for example, if immersed in poison, it gains the ability to poison its target. It also rejects any substance that would damage or tarnish it.

== Fred Saberhagen: Books of the Swords ==
- The Twelve Swords of Power: Forged by Vulcan, they each possess a unique magic property and were scattered across the world.
- Coinspinner: the Sword of Chance - Symbol: dice
- Doomgiver: the Sword of Justice - Symbol: hollow circle
- Dragonslicer: the Sword of Heroes - Symbol: dragon
- Farslayer: the Sword of Vengeance - Symbol: target; that is concentric rings
- Mindsword: the Sword of Glory - Symbol: generic banner
- Shieldbreaker: the Sword of Force - Symbol: hammer
- Sightblinder: the Sword of Stealth - Symbol: human eye
- Soulcutter: the Sword of Despair - Symbol: none
- Stonecutter: the Sword of Siege - Symbol: a wedge, splitting a block
- Townsaver: the Sword of Fury - Symbol: crenelated wall
- Wayfinder: the Sword of Wisdom - Symbol: small white arrow
- Woundhealer: the Sword of Mercy - Symbol: open hand

== Brandon Sanderson: Cosmere ==
- Shardblades: Featured in The Stormlight Archive, shardblades are usually two-handed swords capable of cutting through any nonliving material and are summoned by a wielder who has bonded with one. Living beings struck by shardblades are not cut, but instead wounded in the soul, while wounds from shardblades cause the affected area to go limp. Some are able to summon shardblades through a connection with supernatural creatures known as spren. A prominent shardblade, Oathbringer, is the namesake of the third book in The Stormlight Archive, which partially explores the sword's history with several of the main characters.
- Honorblades: The oldest known shardblades, which were given to a group of immortal beings known as Heralds by their namesake god and creator, Honor. Unlike typical shardblades, Honorblades grant their wielders the supernatural abilities of one of the orders of the Knights Radiant, which varies depending on the Honorblade used.
- Nightblood: First featured in Warbreaker, Nightblood is a sentient sword that, when drawn, usually causes those in its vicinity to attempt to kill each other to claim the sword for themselves. Though powerful, its power consumes the essence or soul of its wielder. Nightblood itself has an innocent, almost childlike personality, as it is unaware of many aspects of the world. It is bound by a single command: "Destroy evil," which can cause problems due to its limited understanding of morality.
- Koloss blades: Featured in the first trilogy of Mistborn books, they are massive swords used by the ogre-like koloss due to being too big for a normal human to wield, though some magic users can increase their strength to do so. The number of swords that a koloss band has influences that band's hierarchy. Due to the koloss' brutal lifestyle and generally low intelligence, the blades are not well maintained or kept sharp.

== J. R. R. Tolkien: Middle-earth ==
- Glamdring: (Sindarin: foe-hammer) Nicknamed "Beater" by the Goblins. First owned and wielded by Turgon, king of Gondolin, it was later wielded by Gandalf the White.
- Narsil: (Quenya: red fire-white brilliance; refers to the Sun and Moon as the great lights of the heavens) The sword of Elendil, which was broken when Elendil fell on it during his battle with Sauron. The shard is used to cut the One Ring from Sauron's hand by Isildur, Elendil's second son, while the sword is an heirloom of the House of Elendil, coming into Aragorn's possession as the heir to the thrones of Arnor and Gondor. It is reforged and renamed Andúril (Quenya: West-brilliance, usually rendered as the Flame of the West), fulfilling the prophecy that it shall be forged anew when the One Ring is found again. Andúril serves as Aragorn's primary weapon and as a symbol of good to all who oppose Sauron. It is the literary opposite of the One Ring.
- Orcrist: (Sindarin: orc/goblin-cleaver) Called "Biter" by the orcs; used by Thorin Oakenshield.
- Ringil: (Quenya: cold-star) The sword of Fingolfin, king of the Noldor elves; used during his duel with Morgoth, the Great Enemy.
- Sting: An Elven knife used as a sword by Bilbo, and later his nephew, Frodo. Sting has the characteristic of glowing when orcs are near, thus serving as an alert to its wielder.
- Anglachel (Sindarin: iron-fire-star) and Anguirel (Sindarin: iron-eternal-star): Swords forged from meteoritic iron by Eöl, the dark elf. They could cleave all earth delved iron.
- Gurthang: (Sindarin: death-iron) A sword formerly known as Anglachel and given its current name by Túrin Turambar, who wielded the sword until his suicide upon Gurthang's point. The sword is notable for apparently being sentient; it appeared to mourn the death of its former owner, the elf Beleg Cúthalion, and spoke in response to being hailed by Túrin just before his death. After being discovered to have broken under Túrin after his death, the shards were buried with him.
- Herugrim: (Rohirric: very fierce, savage) The sword of Théoden, king of Rohan.
- Aranrúth: (Sindarin: king's-ire) The sword of Thingol, King of Doriath in Beleriand.
- Gúthwinë: (Rohirric: battle-friend) The sword of Éomer.
- Barrow-blade: The blades wielded by Frodo Baggins, Samwise Gamgee, Meriadoc Brandybuck and Peregrin Took, which were given to them by Tom Bombadil from a tomb on the Barrow-downs.
- Morgul-knife: A blade wielded by the Nazgul. It is designed to kill over time, as it breaks upon stabbing an enemy, leaving a small shard within them. The blade disintegrates afterwards, while the shard travels to the victim's heart, either killing them or transforming them into a wraith.

Swords only appearing in the film adaptations:

- Hadhafang: Elrond's sword from the Second Age.
- Lhang: A variety of two-handed, curved bladed swords used by Elves.

== Margaret Weis and Tracy Hickman: Darksword ==
- The Darksword: A sword wielded by Joram. It is made of darkstone/iron, which has the ability to absorb Life (magic). Weapons forged from darkstone must be infused with Life from a catalyst and can only be effectively wielded by the Dead (devoid of magical power), who have no magic to be absorbed.

== Tad Williams: Memory, Sorrow, and Thorn ==
Memory, Sorrow, and Thorn are three legendary swords.

- Memory (also known as Minneyar, "Year of Memory"), was forged out of a keel.
- Sorrow, described as an unholy blade, was forged out of black iron and witchwood, a material used by the Sithi.
- Thorn is made out of ore retrieved from a meteorite ("sky-stone"), with a hilt fashioned to resemble a holy tree.

== Gene Wolfe: The Book of the New Sun ==
- Terminus Est: The sword carried by Severian, the Torturer. It contains liquid metal (mercury, but referred to by its Latin name hydrargyrum) within it, making it hard to lift and giving more power on the downswing.

== Roger Zelazny: The Chronicles of Amber ==
- Grayswandir: A sword used by Corwin of Amber and associated with the Moon and the night.
- Werewindle: Also called Rawg; a golden-colored sword used by Brand of Amber. Werewindle is inscribed with portions of the Pattern and is associated with the Sun and the day.

== Various authors: Dungeons & Dragons ==
- Clamorer: The sword of Peirgeiron Paladinson, Lord of Waterdeep.
- Hill Cleaver: The holy avenger sword of Dragonbait.
- Godsbane: The sword wielded by Cyric during the Time of Troubles, which is actually a disguised Avatar of Mask.
- Icingdeath and Twinkle: Twin scimitars wielded by Drizzt Do'Urden.
- Dark Swords: Swords made of strands of shadow essence, wielded by the warriors of Vaasa. If an improper user held the blades, the blades hilt would freeze their hands.
- Druniazth: Thermophagic sword; the name is an anagram of the deity to which it is connected, Tharizdun, "the Chained Oblivion".
- Spike Sword
- Khazid'hea: "Cutter" in the drow language, a sentient sword taken from Dantrag Baenre and wielded by Catti-Brie.
- Charon's Claw: The sword wielded by Artemis Entreri. It is a netherese blade that kills anyone who touches it unless they either mentally overpower it or use the paired gauntlet. It can leave trails of hanging opaque ash to serve as optical barriers, and the gauntlet can redirect magic.

== Andrzej Sapkowski: The Witcher ==
- Zirael (in Elder Speech: Swallow) is a sword given to Ciri by the blacksmith Esterhazy. Leo Bonhart, who enthralled Ciri, wanted to buy this sword for Ciri and make her fight in arenas. Zirael was a gwyhyr, which is a type of sword produced by gnomes. On the sword's blade is the elvish glyph Blathanna Caerme (in Elder Speech: Destiny Wreath).
- Sihill was a sword made by dwarves. According to the Witcher Saga, Sihill's first owner was the dwarf Zoltan Chivay, who gave it to Geralt of Rivia. It has a dwarven glyph on it, which says: For damnation of whoresons.

== In other fiction ==
=== DC Comics ===
- Soultaker Sword: A sword wielded by Katana. It can contain the souls of those it kills and currently contains the soul of Katana's husband Maseo.
- Swords of Sin and Salvation: A pair of swords wielded by the Order of Purity. When used together, they can force others to tell the truth.

=== Marvel Comics ===
- All-Black the Necrosword: The first symbiote created by Knull, which often takes the form of a sword. It is primarily used by Gorr the God Butcher.
- Cerebro Sword: A sword formed by Magneto from Cerebro.
- Blades of Zz'ria: Twin swords used by Kylun that can only harm evildoers.
- Dragonfang: A sword primarily used by Valkyrie. It is indestructible and can summon her pegasus steed Aragorn. The sword is destroyed by Jane Foster after it comes into the possession of Bullseye.
- Ebony Blade: An enchanted sword primarily used by the Black Knight. It can cut through any object, but gradually corrupts its user, making them more violent.
- Godkiller and Grasscutter: Two blades forged by an ancient blacksmith for Zeus and Amatsu-Mikaboshi.
- Godslayer: A sword used by Gamora that is capable of killing gods.
- Hopesword: A sword manifested from the hope of Nightcrawler.
- Light of Galador: A Plandanium sword originally belonging to the Spaceknights of Galador, wielded by Cable.
- Muramasa Blade: A mystical sword that can nullify healing abilities.
- Shurayuki: A sword used by Psylocke.
- Soulsword: A mystical sword which is created from the life force of Magik and primarily wielded by her.
- Souldagger: A mystical sword that is related to the Soulsword and used by Pixie. It can disrupt magic and harm magical beings.
- Starlight Sword: A sword used by Saturnyne.
- Sword of Might: A sword offered to members of the Captain Britain Corps.
- Twilight Sword: A fiery sword used by Surtur.

=== Fablehaven ===
- The sword of light and darkness, which was wielded by Seth Sorenson, then by his sister, Kendra Sorenson. Seth used it to slay Nagi Luna and Graulas, while Kendra used it to slay Gorgrog, the demon king.

=== Homestuck ===
- Ancestral Awakening Sword: A sword which can be materialised by Vriska Serket when she uses her Fluorite Octet.
- Caledfwlch: An alchemized sword which Dave Strider uses.
- Caledscratch: An alchemized sword with time-altering qualities which Dave Strider uses.
- Cutlass of Zillywair: An alchemized sword from legendary cherubim folklore which Jade Harley wields temporarily.
- Regisword: Jack Noir's sword.
- Royal Deringer: A sword given to an alternate universe version of Dave Strider.
- Snoop Dogg Snow Cone Machete: An alchemized sword with time-altering qualities which Dave Strider uses.
- Unbreakable Katana: Bro and Dirk Strider's main weapon of choice.
- sord.....: An alchemized sword of terrible quality covered in jpeg artifacts, which Dave Strider uses.
- Scarlet Ribbitar: An alchemized sword which Dave Strider uses.

=== The Legend of Zelda ===
- Master Sword: Known as "the Blade of Evil's Bane" and "the Sword that Seals the Darkness", it can only be wielded by someone who does not possess an evil heart and it is said that only a member or a descendant of the bloodline of the knights of Hyrule can pull it from its pedestal. It is wielded by the various incarnations of Link to defend Hyrule from Ganon and other evil. In some games, it shines when at full power and guards against harmful magic.
- Biggoron Sword: In The Legend of Zelda: Ocarina of Time, it is a two-handed greatsword forged by Goron blacksmith Biggoron.
- Fierce Deity Sword: In The Legend of Zelda: Majora's Mask, it is a two-handed greatsword with a double-helix design wielded by Link in his Fierce Deity form.
- Four Sword/Picori Blade: A sword forged by the Minish as a gift to the kingdom of Hyrule, which allows its wielder to split into four beings.
- Sword of Sages: In The Legend of Zelda: Twilight Princess, it is a holy weapon used by the Six Sages in an attempt to execute Ganondorf. However, Ganondorf survives due to being protected by the Triforce and steals the sword for himself.

=== Fire Emblem ===
- Falchion: A sword wielded by Marth in Fire Emblem: Shadow Dragon, Alm in Fire Emblem Gaiden, and Chrom in Fire Emblem Awakening. In Awakening, Chrom's daughter Lucina travels from the future wielding the Parallel Falchion to prevent his death and avert a global calamity. In the final support conversation between Lucina and her possible siblings, it is implied they are also capable of wielding the sword. It is also implied that the Falchion wielded by Alm is distinct from the one wielded by Marth and his descendants and that both are forged from the fangs of dragons.
- Tyrfing: A sword in Fire Emblem: Genealogy of the Holy War, wielded by Sigurd and later his son Seliph. It was once wielded by the Crusader of Light, Baldr, bestowed upon him during the Miracle of Darna. Tyrfing is the property of the descendants of Baldr, who founded House Chalphy of Grannvale.
- Mystletainn: A sword in Fire Emblem: Genealogy of the Holy War wielded by Eldigan and later by Ares. It was once wielded by Crusader Hoðr, bestowed upon him during the Miracle of Darna.
- Balmung: A sword in Fire Emblem: Genealogoy of the Holy War wielded by the Crusader Od, which represents the kingdom of Isaach. Shannan, possessing the holy blood of Od, is the only character capable of wielding Balmung.
- Durandal: A sword in Fire Emblem: The Blazing Blade wielded by Roland during The Scouring to purge the dragons. After its seal was disturbed, it was wielded by Eliwood, a descendant of Roland. After accidentally killing Ninian in her ice dragon form with the sword, Eliwood refused to wield Durandal again until the final battle against Nergal.
- Binding Blade: A sword wielded by Roy during the final chapters of Fire Emblem: The Binding Blade. The sword is said to be stronger than the other legendary weapons of Elibe, and was sealed at the Shrine of Seals by Hartmut, the founder of the Kingdom of Bern.
- Sieglinde: A sword wielded by Eirika in Fire Emblem: The Sacred Stones. Also known as the Thunder Sword, it is one of the Sacred Twins of the country Renais, along with the Flame Lance Siegmund, wielded by Eirika's brother Ephraim. Like other Sacred Twin relics, it is especially powerful against monsters.
- Audhulma: A legendary sword appearing in Fire Emblem: The Sacred Stones. One of the Sacred Twins of the nation of Jehanna, it is also called the Ice Sword. It can be wielded by any player unit with high enough proficiency in swordsmanship.
- Ragnell: A weapon wielded by Ike in the games Fire Emblem: Path of Radiance and Fire Emblem: Radiant Dawn. It was originally wielded by Altina, the founder and first Apostle of Begnion; the goddess Ashera consecrated the sword for Altina's service to her in war. As a sacred treasure of Begnion, it was eventually inherited by its top general, Zelgius, also known as the Black Knight. The Black Knight offered Ragnell to Greil, his teacher and Ike's father, in order to have a proper sword duel; after Greil's defeat, the Black Knight leaves Ragnell behind, wordlessly intending for Ike to take it. Generations after the events of Path of Radiance and Radiant Dawn, the sword is wielded by Ike's descendant Priam in Fire Emblem Awakening.
- Alondite: A weapon wielded by the Black Knight in Fire Emblem: Path of Radiance and Fire Emblem: Radiant Dawn. It is the silver counterpart to Ragnell, bearing an identical design and power. Like Ragnell, it was wielded by Altina and blessed by Ashera. After offering Ragnell to Greil, the Black Knight defeats him in a duel, killing him with Alondite. In his guise as the Black Knight, Zelgius carries the blade until his death in the Goddess Tower. Once claimed by Ike, it can be wielded by any member of the army with sufficient skill in the sword.
- Yato: A sword in Fire Emblem Fates, wielded by Corrin. It was forged by the Rainbow Sage, one of the twelve dragons that fought each other in a war, along with the other four divine weapons: Raijinto, Fujin Yumi, Siegfried, and Brynhildr. Humanity was selected to wield these weapons, which plunged them into the war. Uniting Yato's power with the other divine weapons allows it to gain a new form depending on the weapon. With the power of all the weapons, it transforms into its true form, the Omega Yato.
- Raijinto: One of the five divine weapons in Fire Emblem Fates, which was originally wielded by the former king of Hoshido, Sumeragi, and currently by his son, Ryoma.
- Siegfried: One of the five divine weapons in Fire Emblem Fates, wielded by Xander.
- Sword of the Creator: A sword in Fire Emblem: Three Houses. One of the Hero's Relics of Fódlan, it was crafted from the bones of the dragon goddess Sothis and initially wielded by Nemesis, the King of Liberation, and later by Byleth after it is revealed that they possess the Crest of Flames necessary to wield it.
- Blutgang: A sword in Fire Emblem: Three Houses and a Hero's Relic, which was wielded by Maurice until he transformed into the Wandering Beast after overusing its power. Following Maurice's defeat, his descendant Marianne von Edmund retrieves it and may become its new wielder.
- Thunderbrand: A sword in Fire Emblem: Three Houses, it is a Hero's Relic that was the relic of the House of Charon. It is wielded by Catherine, a famed knight of Seiros, as she possesses the Crest of Charon. She has wielded the sword since her service within the Holy Kingdom of Faerghus.

=== Final Fantasy ===
- Buster Sword: Cloud Strife's weapon in Final Fantasy VII, which, as revealed in Crisis Core: Final Fantasy VII, was originally wielded by Angeal Hewley, who passed it onto Zack Fair. Zack, in turn, bequeathed it to Cloud as he was dying. In Final Fantasy VII: Advent Children, Cloud retires the Buster Sword and begins wielding the Fusion Swords, a set of blades that combine to form a single sword.
- Excalibur: A sword that appears throughout the series and named for the sword in Arthurian legend.
- Gunblade: Squall Leonhart's weapon, a sword with a hilt resembling a gun's receiver and handle. The concept is also used in Final Fantasy XIV, where it is used by the Garlean Empire and the Gunbreaker job class.

=== High School DxD ===
- Excalibur: One of the legendary Holy Swords created using magic and alchemy, which was one of the dual Holy Swords of King Arthur alongside its sister blade Caliburn, the Sword in the Stone. Excalibur was destroyed in an ancient war and reforged into seven different swords, each harbouring an aspect of its power, that came into ownership of the Christianity religious order as weapons for Exorcism. Excalibur is currently wielded by Xenovia, who restored it after combining its fragments. Excalibur's scabbard was also discovered by Grigori and given to Xenovia.
- Durandal: One of the legendary Holy Swords created using magic and alchemy. Originally wielded by Roland, the Paladin of the Holy Roman Emperor Charlemagne, it later became a weapon for Exorcism by the Church and is currently wielded by Xenovia.
- Caliburn: The Sword in the Stone, which choose King Arthur to be king of Britain in Arthurian legend and is the most powerful Holy Sword. Caliburn was passed down among King Arthur's descendants as a family heirloom and is currently wielded by Arthur Pendragon, a modern descendant of King Arthur.
- Hauteclaire: Another legendary Holy Sword originally wielded by Oliver, the best friend of Roland, and currently wielded by Irina Shido.
- Galantine: Another legendary Holy Sword originally wielded by Gawain, one of the knights of the Round Table and King Arthur's nephew.

=== Wo Long: Fallen Dynasty ===
- Yitian Jian: A treasured Imperial Jian of the Late Han Dynasty, which was awarded to Cao Cao when he was appointed as one of the Eight Colonels of the Western Garden. The Jian has the Vermilion Bird engraved on the golden handguard, a reference to Cao Cao's Divine Beast Zhuque.
- Bai Hong: A treasured Jian favoured by Sun Quan. Its white blade is just as its name suggests, shining with beautiful brilliance.
- Guding Dao: A dao wielded by Sun Jian characterized by its wide and sharp blade and the tooth-like serrations on the back of the blade.
- Bagu Dao: A dao used by Yan Liang that was made from the bone of a Hanba, a Chinese mythical monster that brings about drought.
- Gan Jiang and Mo Ye are a pair of swords forged by the Spring and Autumn master swordsmith Gan Jiang and his wife Mo Ye. The male sword Gan Jiang has a tortoise-shell pattern, while the female sword Mo Ye has a water-wave pattern.
- Yu Wang Jian: Also known as Xia Ge Sword, it is an ancient bronze Jian created by Yu the Great, the founding monarch of the Xia Dynasty, and wielded by Yu Ji. The twenty-eight Chinese constellations and the words "mountains, rivers, sun and moon" are engraved on the black blade.

=== Other ===
- Soul Reaver/Wraith Blade: A soul-devouring flamberge sword wielded by the vampire Kain and, later, the wraith Raziel that serves as an important plot device in the Legacy of Kain series.
- Balaraw: Also known as Espada ni Panday, literally "Meteorite Sword", it is the sword of Filipino hero Panday.
- Murakumo: A treasured katana of the Kazanari family and the favourite sword of Fudo Kazanari in Symphogear.
- Chaz: A sentient magical sword in the webcomic Sluggy Freelance, whose magical abilities are activated when soaked in the blood of an innocent.
- Crucible: A blade of energy featured in the Doom series. It requires charge to use, but can kill enemies in a single hit.
- Hina: A cursed katana in Love Hina that possesses the spirit of an enemy that once fought the line of Shinmei-Ryu swordsmen to near extinction and is capable of possessing its wielder. Belonging to the Urashima clan, Keitaro Urashima gives it to Motoko Aoyama after her sword, Shisui, breaks.
- Shisui: Shisui (止水; Stopping Water) is a white-wood shirasaya wielded by Motoko Aoyama in Love Hina. Originally Tsuruko Aoyama's favored sword, she passed it on to her sister as a farewell gift.
- Tessaiga: A sword wielded by Inuyasha. As "the sword of destruction", it is the opposite of Sesshōmaru's inherited sword, the Tenseiga, which is "the sword of life".
- Kijin-marukuni-shige: A katana belonging to foreign exchange student Susan in High School DxD.
- Rain Dragon: The sword owned by Judge Dee in the novels of Robert van Gulik.
- Singing Sword: The sword of Prince Valiant, sister sword to Excalibur. It was given to Valiant by his former rival Prince Arn.
- St. Michael's Sword: A sword from the novel Riptide. It is said to have the power to kill anyone who looks at it. In reality, it can also kill its wielder, being forged from a meteorite composed of radioactive iridium-80, an isotope of iridium, one second of direct exposure equivalent to a lethal dose.
- Yūnagi: Yūnagi (夕凪; Evening Calm) is the nodachi of Setsuna Sakurazaki in Negima! Magister Negi Magi, given to her by Eishun Konoe.
- Z Sword: From Dragon Ball Z, it is a large broadsword in which the Kaioshin, Old Kai was sealed by the God of Destruction Beerus after an argument between them during a meeting between the Kaioshin and the Gods of Destruction.
- Brave Sword: In Dragon Ball Z: Wrath of the Dragon, it is a longsword used by Tapion and Kid Trunks. It was forged by a Konatsian wizard to combat Hirudegarn, who was cut in two by the blade and sealed with Tapion and his brother.
- Sword of Chaos: The sword wielded by Sarevok in Baldur's Gate, which is later acquired by the protagonist in Baldur's Gate: Shadows of Amn.
- Keyblade: The weapon that Sora and various others wield in the Kingdom Hearts series, which is said to be capable of bringing prosperity or destruction. It can open any lock it is confronted with, physical or otherwise. Sora's Keyblade changes its appearance and abilities depending on the keychain Sora equips.
- In The Witcher, Aerondight refers to Lancelot's blade Arondight, and Zirael is the name of two swords used by Cirilla, with its name meaning Swallow in Elder Speech.
- Dragon Buster: The weapon created by Winglies to kill dragons and dragoons during the Dragon Campaign in The Legend of Dragoon. When used, a glowing mass appears around the hand and several tentacles come out of the user's wrist and the sword forms. The handle is in the shape of a large red dragon's head and the blade is an ethereal blade of yellow-orange flame that can be adjusted in length. Thus, the sword as a whole resembles a dragon breathing fire. It is used by Lloyd to kill the Jade Dragoon, Lavitz. It is later used by the Dark Dragoon, Rose, and Red Dragoon, Zieg, to kill the wingly, Melbu Frahma.
- Luck & Pluck: A sword given to Jonathan Joestar as a gift from the defeated Bruford. He later uses it against Dio Brando.
- Tsumehirameki: From Arifureta: From Commonplace to World's Strongest, a katana that Hajime Nagumo gives to Shizuku Yaegashi as a gift.
- Murata-Tou: A guntō crafted by Tsuneyoshi Murata of the Imperial Japanese Army and given to Saeko Busujima in Highschool of the Dead.
- Golden Sword of Fire: One of the Four Golden weapons from Lego's Ninjago Theme. Initially used alongside the other Golden Weapons to create the realm of Ninjago, it is claimed by Kai, the Elemental Master of Fire. In the series' third season, the Golden Weapons are melted, and in the show's tenth season, a piece of golden armor is destroyed to reforge them.
- Greinkel: Roland Days's sword in Forged Fates.
- Dragonslayer: A greatsword wielded by Guts in Berserk. It was made by the blacksmith Godot in response to a request by his liege lord for a weapon that could slay a dragon. The sword's ungainliness was by design; tired of the constant requests he got from nobles for 'elegant' weapons, Godot made the Dragonslayer as a somewhat sarcastic commentary. Moved into storage after fleeing the liege lord's wrath, it lay unused for years until Guts became its wielder.
- Mythcarver: Appearing in Critical Role and The Legend of Vox Machina, it is a legendary longsword bestowed upon the bard Scanlan Shorthalt. Mythcarver is one of the Vestiges of the Divergence that aids Vox Machine in defeating the Chroma Conclave.
- Monado: A recurring weapon in the Xenoblade series that can manipulate ether and allows its wielder to see visions of the future. It also appears in Xenoblade Chronicles 2, where it is wielded by Shulk's Driver, and in Xenoblade Chronicles 3 as a skin for Swordfighter weapons.
- Aegis Sword: The weapon of Pyra and Mythra in Xenoblade Chronicles 2. It also appears in Xenoblade Chronicles 3 as a skin for Swordfighter weapons.
- Lucky Seven: The weapon of Noah in Xenoblade Chronicles 3. It was created by the Nopon Riku and is made from Origin metal, giving it the ability to destroy Flame Clocks. In Noah's Ouroboros form, Lucky Seven becomes the Sword of the End, which is alleged to cut through reality.
- Soul Edge/Soul Calibur: A pair of zweihander swords that appear in the Soul Calibur series. The Soul Edge is a sentient, cursed sword that overtakes its user, driving them to countless atrocities, while Soul Calibur is Soul Edge's counterpart, a pure blade made to counter and seal it.
- High-Frequency Blade: Featured in the Metal Gear Solid series and its spinoffs, most notably wielded by Raiden. While resembling traditional katana and chokutō, they are designed to use alternating current and high vibration frequencies to drastically increase their cutting power. Later models are able to deflect bullets and cut even metal or concrete.
- Moonlight Greatsword: A magical sword which has appeared in almost every video game published by From Software. It first appears in King's Field, and has since been iterated in the Armored Core, Ninja Blade, Evergrace, Spriggan: Lunar Verse, Otogi, Demon's Souls, Dark Souls, Bloodborne, Elden Ring, and Elden Ring: Nightreign games and franchises. While each Moonlight Greatsword is slightly different, it is almost always an incorporeal blade of pure magic, and its signature ability is launching blue beams of energy to attack.

== In film and television ==
=== Bionicle ===
- Fire Sword: Tahu Mata's Toa Tool, used to channel his fire powers. It is also used by Akamai, a being resulting in the fusion of Tahu, Onua, and Pohatu. The Firesword was changed into twin Magma Swords when Tahu was transformed into a Toa Nuva by Energized Protodermis.
- Ice Sword: Kopaka's Toa Tool as a Toa Mata, along with his Ice Shield, used to channel his ice powers. Prior to becoming a Toa Nuva, Kopaka had only one blade.
- Magma Swords: Used by Tahu Nuva, they are able to turn into a surfboard.
- Air Sword: Toa Lesovikk's Toa Tool, used to channel his air powers.
- Air Katanas: Toa Lewa Nuva's Toa Tools, which can be used as glider wings. After Reidak snaps one of the Katanas in half in BIONICLE Legends 1: Island of Doom and then confiscated after he was imprisoned in the Piraka Stronghold, the Voya Nui Resistance Team had rescued the Toa Nuva, one of them had offered to make Lewa a new Katana.
- Aqua Warblade: Hewkii Mahri's Toa Tool, said to be one of the finest swords ever made and designed to be used only by a master warrior. While Hewkii has had this weapon ever since he became a Toa Mahri, he seems to channel his stone powers through his hands instead.
- Aero Slicers: Matau's Toa Tools, used to channel his air powers and used as glider wings and rotors.
- Fire Great Swords: Two blades owned by Toa Lihkan, as seen in Bionicle 2: Legends of Metru Nui. They connect along the toothed blade to make a shield that functions as a lava surfboard.

=== Conan the Barbarian (1982) ===
- Atlantean Sword: A sword found by Conan in a tomb.
- The Father's/The Master's sword: A sword made by Conan's father at the beginning of the movie. The sword is not named in the movie, licensed replicas of the sword have been identified by these names.

=== Crouching Tiger, Hidden Dragon ===
- Green Destiny: Mu Bai's sword, which he gives to his friend Sir Te.

=== The Golden Blade ===
- Sword of Damaskus: A golden sword that can cut through anything and makes its wielder invincible. It is used by Harun Al-Rashid to free a fairy-tale Bagdad from Jafar.

=== Heroes ===
- Kensei Sword: A katana wielded by Takezo Kensei and later Hiro Nakamura.

=== Hook ===
- Pan Sword: The sword of Peter Pan. After Peter left Neverland and grew up, the Lost Boy Rufio took the sword and became the new Pan. When Peter returns to Neverland to rescue the children, Rufio returns the sword to him. After defeating Captain Hook in a final duel, Peter gives the sword to Thud Butt, one of the Lost Boys.

=== Kill Bill ===
- Sword of Hattori Hanzō: A sword used by The Bride and forged by a legendary Japanese swordsmith.

=== KonoSuba ===
- Chunchunmaru: Kazuma Satou's katana, named by Megumin. It was created by a blacksmith at his request.

=== Masters of the Universe ===
- Power Sword: Also known as the Sword of Power, it was given to Prince Adam by the Sorceress of Grayskull. It allows him to transform into He-Man and his pet tiger, Cringer, into Battle Cat.
- Sword of Protection: The weapon wielded by Adora, which allows her to transform into She-Ra and her horse, Spirit, into the winged unicorn Swift Wind.

=== Nasuverse ===
- Caliburn: The sword that Arthur took out of the stone, engraved with the words "Whosoe'er pulleth out this sword of this stone is rightwise king born of England". Its appearance is similar to Excalibur, which was given to Arthur by the Lady of the Lake.
- Arondight: A holy sword wielded by Lancelot that is the counterpart of King Arthur's Excalibur. It was given only to someone who could be exalted as the "perfect knight", the strongest, bravest and truest knight of an era, which signifies Lancelot being unrivaled out of those who sat at the Round Table of Camelot.
- Excalibur Galatine: The shining sword that Sir Gawain possesses. It is the sister-sword of Excalibur also originally owned by the Lady of the Lake, but it is not as well known as a holy sword and rarely mentioned due to its legend being overshadowed by that of King Arthur's holy sword. While Excalibur collects the lights from the planet, Sir Gawain's holy sword is said to represent the rays of heat from the sun with a Pseudo-Sun contained in the hilt.
- Caladbolg: The sword wielded by Fergus mac Róich, with which he redirected his anger at not being able to kill the one who tricked him out of kingship by cleanly blasting the top of three hills like a long rainbow.
- Kanshou and Bakuya: "Married" twin swords forged by Gan Jiang and Mo Ye that represent Ying and Yang. The main ability of the swords is their strong bond with each other, which allows them to attract each other. It is also said that they will return to their owner even if they are lost. If one is thrown while the other is held, the thrown sword will return to the wielder, similar to a boomerang. They are wielded by Servant Archer.
- Ea: The single most powerful weapon in existence, Ea can – at full power – destroy the entire world. Due to predating the concept of a "sword", being crystallized during the Age of Gods at the beginning of the world, it is not something that can truly be called a sword or have the shape of any known blade. As such, it is the only sword that does not exist in the current world or appear in any modern legends. It is possessed by Gilgamesh, and is the only sword that Archer and Emiya cannot Trace.
- Merodach: The Original Sin (原罪メロダック, GenzaiMerodakku) is the original model of the "legends of swords of selection in the various lands of the world" and "the foundation of the sacred right to select the king", including Gram and the sword modeled on Gram, Caliburn. It is possessed by Gilgamesh in the Gate of Babylon. It utilizes the same power as Caliburn, a "light that can burn away everything it touches".
- Durandal: The Peerless Sword is the holy sword favored by Roland and one of the many Noble Phantasms stored in Gilgamesh's Gate of Babylon. The sword is a splendidly forged "symbol of power" much like King Arthur's Caliburn, and it is said to hold three miracles within it. It will not lose its sharpness even if its user's magical energy were to be depleted, proving indestructible even when Roland tried to destroy it.
- Harpe: Immortal Slaying Scythe is a divine sword from Greek mythology used by Perseus to kill the Gorgon Medusa. It was given to him by Hermes, and, as it was returned to him once the task was completed, can be called an "Anti-Medusa" weapon.
- Crocea Mors: Yellow Death is the golden sword of Julius Caesar, endowed with an ability in close-range combat that makes victory assured from the moment he sees the enemy.

=== Pirates of the Caribbean ===
- Sword of Cortés: A sword which Jack Sparrow and his crew seek to find in Pirates of the Caribbean: Jack Sparrow after he and Arabella Smith discovered its scabbard as children. In the third book, The Pirate Chase, Jack's crew reunites the Sword of Cortés with its enchanted sheath; however, after Jack reads the mystical incantation, the specter of Hernán Cortés appears. In the fourth book, The Sword of Cortés, Cortés teaches Jack how to wield the sword, but it is revealed that he was using Jack and intends to reclaim his former sword. After the spirit of Montecuhzoma defeats Cortés in battle, Jack uses the sword's power to undo his past actions before giving it to Tia Dalma for safekeeping.
- Sword of Triton: Blackbeard's sword, which is wielded by Hector Barbossa and appears in Pirates of the Caribbean: On Stranger Tides. According to the film's visual guide, the Sword of Triton was forged in Atlantis, while the Pirates of the Caribbean Online states that it was forged by Triton, passing between ancient mariners until falling into Blackbeard's possession. In On Stranger Tides, Blackbeard uses the sword to ensnare the crew of the Queen Anne's Revenge and command the wind to sail the Revenge to Tortuga. Terry Rossio's unproduced screenplay for Dead Men Tell No Tales reveals that the sword's powers come from Rhysis, one of the three Pearls of Neptune, which can control the winds and was hidden inside the sapphire embedded in the Sword's hilt.

=== Power Rangers ===
- Power Sword: The default weapon of Jason Lee Scott and his successor, Rocky DeSantos. Its blade is energized with red energy.
- Sword of Darkness: The sword used by the Green Ranger, Tommy Oliver, while under Rita Repulsa's control until Jason destroys it, freeing him.
- Sword of Power: A sword that grants its wielder power and can only be summoned when all six Rangers combine their powers. It is said to have been created from the remains of the Sword of Darkness.
- Sword of Light: A sword that allowed Zordon to transfer the powers of Rangers to new chosen Rangers. He uses it on Jason Lee Scott, Zack Taylor, and Trini Kwan to make Rocky DeSantos, Adam Park, and Aisha Campbell the new Red, Black, and Yellow Rangers.
- Saba: A talking saber with the head of a tiger which granted Tommy Oliver, as the White Ranger, control of the Tigerzord and assisted Tommy in piloting the Zord. He is restored after Tommy gains the White Ninja Ranger powers.
- Zeo Sword: The personal weapon of Zeo Ranger V, Tommy Oliver, in Power Rangers: Zeo.
- Turbo Sword: A sword wielded by the Turbo Rangers.
- Turbo Lightning Sword: The Red Turbo Ranger's personal weapon.
- Spiral Saber: The Red Ranger's personal weapon in Power Rangers in Space. It has a drill-like blade and can be combined with an Astro Blaster and equipped with a "Booster" attachment.
- Super Silverizer: The Silver Ranger's personal weapon in Power Rangers in Space, which doubles as a blaster.
- Quasar Sabers: A quintet of legendary swords that rested on the Planet Mirinoi for over 3,000 years awaiting the chosen ones in Power Rangers: Lost Galaxy. Once released from the stone, the Sabers granted each of their wielders Ranger powers and can be charged up to unleash their elemental powers.
- Magna Blaster: Magna Defender's signature rifle, which can also transform into a sword.
- Savage Sword: A sword said to be more powerful than the Quasar Sabers combined, growing more powerful after each successful hit. The Pink Psycho Ranger managed to retrieve it to fight the Space and Galaxy Rangers, even destroying the Pink Space Ranger's Astro Morpher. The Pink Galaxy Ranger sacrificed her life to restore the Morpher and destroy the sword.
- Chrono Sabers: Sword wielded by the Rangers in Power Rangers Time Force.
- Quantum Defender: Wes the Quantum Ranger's personal firearm, which can change into a sword.
- Golden Eagle Sword: Yellow Ranger's primary weapon in Power Rangers: Wild Force.
- Ninja Swords: The Ninja Storm basic sword.
- Golden Ninja Swords: A powered version of the Ninja Swords.
- Samurai Saber: The personal weapon of the Green Samurai Ranger.
- Thundermax Saber: The basic sword of Dino Thunder.
- SPD practice Katana: A basic katana for practice.
- Shadow Saber: The personal blade of the Shadow Ranger.
- Excelsior: A sword sought by Thrax, it was held by a female statue that came to life after seeing the determination of the then-powerless Operation Overdrive Rangers and deemed them worthy of wielding the sword.
- Sentinel Sword: Sentinel Knight merged with Excelsior, giving him the ability to transform into a sword.

=== Star Trek ===
- Bat'leth: Ceremonial swords used by the Klingon.
- Kar'takin: Straight-bladed polearms used by the Jem'Hadar in close combat and by Starfleet officers and the Jem'Hadar in Star Trek: Deep Space Nine.

=== Star Wars ===
- Lightsaber: A weapon used by the Jedi, the Sith, and other users of the Force.

=== Sword Art Online ===
- Anneal Blade: A one-handed sword that Kirito obtained on the first day of Sword Art Online's launch.
- Elucidator: A one-handed longsword, pitch-black from blade to hilt. Kirito's main-hand weapon throughout the majority of Sword Art Online.
- Lambent Light: A rapier used by Asuna.
- Guilty Thorn: A custom-made barbed blade created by the player Grimlock.
- Dark Repulser: Another sword used by Kirito, forged by Lisbeth using a Crystallite Ingot. Kirito uses it as his off-hand weapon when dual-wielding. The sword is destroyed in Kirito's second encounter with Kayaba Akihiko.

=== Slayers ===
- Sword of Light: Wielded by Gourry Gabriev. The metal blade could be removed from the hilt, allowing Gourry to summon a blade of magical energy that could affect creatures immune to normal weapons or most magic. The energy blade also serves as a spell focus. In the anime, it is one of the five Dark Star weapons and given the name "Gorun Nova".
- Howling Sword: The weapon of the mercenary swordsman Zangalus. Crafted by the corrupted "great priest" Rezo, the Howling Sword could generate great gusts of wind.

=== Thundarr the Barbarian ===
- Sunsword: The sword wielded by Thundarr.

=== ThunderCats ===
- Sword of Omens: The sword wielded by Lion-O.

=== The Vikings (1958) ===
- Requiter: Royal sword of Northumbria.

=== Voltron ===
- Blazing Swords are wielded by each of the unified Voltrons.

=== Zatoichi ===
- Shikomizue: A swordstick wielded by Zatoichi. It is disguised as a cane concealing a short blade in the shaft and a dagger in the hilt.

== See also ==
- Flaming sword (mythology)
- List of historical swords
- List of magical weapons
- List of mythological swords
- Magic sword
- Sword of Damocles
