= List of Wazamono =

Wazamono (Japanese: 業(わざ)物(もの); lit. "well-performing instrument" (業(わざ) meaning "performance" and 物(もの) "object")) is a Japanese term that, in a literal sense, refers to an instrument that plays as it should; in the context of Japanese swords and sword collecting, wazamono denotes any sword with a sharp edge that has been tested to cut well, usually by professional sword appraisers via the art of tameshigiri (test cutting).

The term wazamono has been popularized by two books published during the late Edo period. The first is called Kaihō Kenjaku (懐宝剣尺), a single-volume authoritative index classifying historic Japanese swordsmiths based on the quality (cutting performance) of their blades; the book's first edition was compiled and published in 1797, with re-publishings made in 1805 and 1815 due to the book's popularity. The contents, written and edited by Tsuge Heisuke Masayoshi (柘植平助方理), a samurai of the Karatsu Domain in Hizen Province, were based on the recorded cutting tests done by Yamada Asaemon V Yoshimutsu (山田浅右衛門5代吉睦), an executioner of the Tokugawa Shogunate and fifth head of the famous Yamada Asaemon (山田浅右衛門) line of sword testers; single cuts were performed on the corpses of executed criminals aged 30 to 50, cutting their torsos roughly above nipple height.

The Kaihō Kenjaku identified, in total, 163 (228 if counting the "mixed" category) wazamono swordsmiths, grouped into four "grades" (位列, iretsu) based on the cutting performance of their blades:

- Saijō Ōwazamono (最上大業物; "Supreme Grade") — the highest grade, which counted 12 swordsmiths whose swords could cut through torsos 8–9 out of 10 times;
- Ōwazamono (大業物; "Excellent Grade") — the second-highest grade, counting 21 swordsmiths whose swords could cut through torsos 7–8 out of 10 times;
- Yokiwazamono or Ryōwazamono (良業物; "Very Good Grade") — the third-highest grade, counting 50 swordsmiths whose swords could cut through torsos 5–7 out of 10 times;
- Wazamono (業物; "Good Grade") — the fourth and lowest grade, counting 80 swordsmiths whose swords could cut through torsos 3–4 out of 10 times.

The Mixed Grades (大業物・良業物・業物混合) category included 65 additional swordsmiths noted for having swords of mixed quality/sharpness level (Ōwazamono, Yoki-/Ryōwazamono, Wazamono).

The 1805 and 1815 re-publishings of Kaihō Kenjaku saw adjustments be made to the rankings. In 1830, a second book, called Kokon Kaji Bikō (古今鍛冶備考; lit. 'Ancient and Modern Blacksmith Notes'), was published as a major revised list of the wazamono ratings. This new list yet again made amends to the original, and new sword makers were added, such that there were now 15 sword makers in the Saijō Ōwazamono (Supreme) category, 21 in the Ōwazamono (Excellent) category, 58 in the Yokiwazamono (Very Good) category, 93 in the Wazamono (Good) category, and 68 in the mixed category, for a total of 255 swords. This time, the cutting tests had been conducted by the 7th head of the Yamada family lineage, Yamada Asaemon Yoshitoshi (山田朝右衛門吉利).

The katana forged by Nagasone Kotetsu, one of the top-rated swordsmiths, became very popular at the time when the books were published, and many counterfeits were made. Furthermore, the swordsmiths treated specially in the Kyōhō Meibutsu-chō (a catalogue of excellent swords in the collections of daimyō from the Kyōhō era) and Muramasa (famous at that time for forging swords of high cutting ability) were omitted from the listings. The reasons are thought to be that Yamada was afraid of challenging the authority of the shōgun, that he could not use precious swords possessed by the daimyō in the examination, and that he was considerate of the legend of Muramasa's curse.

A misconception about the wazamono classification is that it is a sword ranking, since the term wazamono itself refers to swords; however, the grades pertain to swordsmiths, graded according to the cutting ability of their blades. See the below list of the swordsmiths listed in the Kaihō Kenjaku.

== Twelve (12) Saijō Ōwazamono ==
The original list of 12 swordsmiths who, based on the cutting ability of their blades, hold the highest rank of Saijō Ōwazamono (Supreme Grade):

- Osafune Hidemitsu (長船秀光) = Hidemitsu II
- Mihara Masaie (四代三原正家) = Masaie IV
- Osafune Motoshige (長船元重)

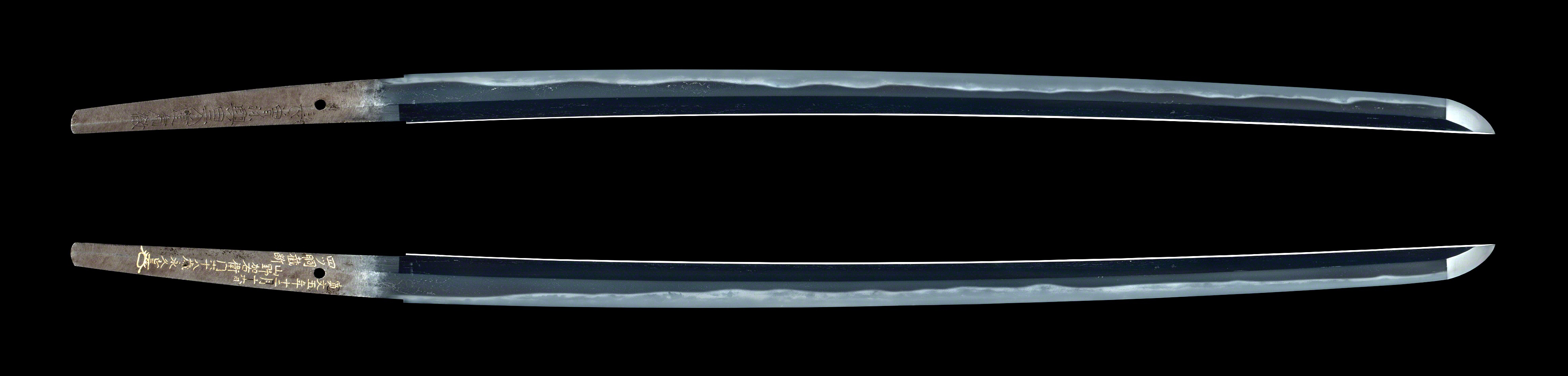
Katana forged by Nagasone Kotetsu. The letters inlaid with gold on the tang (nakago) indicated that Yamano Kauemon (山野加右衛門), the official executioner of the Tokugawa shogunate and examiner of sword cutting performance, cut four human torsos overlapped.

- Nagasone Okisato (長曾弥興里) = Nagasone Kotetsu (虎徹), AKA Kotetsu I (初代虎徹)
- Nagasone Okimasa (長曾弥興正) = Kotetsu II (二代虎徹)
- Seikan Kanemoto (清関兼元) = Kanemoto I (初代兼元)
- Magoroku Kanemoto (孫六兼元) = Kanemoto II (二代兼元)
- Tatara Nagayuki (多々良長幸)
- Miyoshi Nagamichi (初代三善長道) = Nagamichi I (初代長道)
- Sendai Kunikane I (初代仙台国包)
- Hizen Tadayoshi I (初代忠吉)
- Hizen Tadayoshi III = Mutsu no Kami Tadayoshi (陸奥守忠吉)

In the reprinted edition released in 1805 as well as the major revised edition of 1830, the three swordsmiths Soboro Sukehiro (ソボロ助広), Osafune Kagemitsu (長船景光), and Izuminokami Kanesada (和泉守兼定 = Kanesada II) were added to the list.

== Twenty-one (21) Ōwazamono ==
The original list of 21 swordsmiths who, based on the cutting ability of their blades, hold the second-highest rank of Ōwazamono (Excellent Grade):

- Takatenjin Kaneaki (高天神兼明)
- Kashū Kanewaka I (加州兼若)
- Kanenori (兼則)
- Iyo Daijō Katsukuni I (伊予大掾初代勝国)
- Horikawa Kunihiro (堀川国広)
- Izumi no Kami Kunisada I (初代和泉守国貞)
- Horikawa Kuniyasu (堀川国安)
- Higo no Kami Kuniyasu I (肥後守国康 (初代))
- Tsushima no Kami Sadashige I (対馬守貞重 (初代))
- Yosozaemon Sukesada (与三左衛門祐定)
- Tōshiro Sukesada (藤四郎祐定)
- Tsuda Sukehiro (津田助広)
- Ōmi no Daijō Fujiwara Tadahiro (近江大椽忠広)
- Echigo no Kami Kanesada II (越後守包貞 (二代))
- Fujishima Tomoshige (藤島友重)
- Echizen no Kami Nobuyoshi (越前守信吉)
- Mondonoshō Masakiyo (主水正正清)
- Shūri no Suke Morimitsu (修理亮盛光)
- Sakyō no Suke Yasumitsu (左京亮康光)
- Ichinohira Yasuyo or Ippei Yasuyo (一平安代)
- Osafune Yoshikage (備州長船義景)

== Fifty (50) Yoki-/Ryōwazamono ==
The original list of 50 swordsmiths who, based on the cutting ability of their blades, hold the third-highest rank of Yokiwazamono (Very Good Grade), alternatively pronounced Ryōwazamono (modern reading):

- Osafune Iesuke II (長船家助 (二代))
- Wakasa no Kami Ujifusa (若狭守氏房)
- Jirō Saemon Katsumitsu (次郎左衛門勝光)
- Ukyō Susumu Katsumitsu (右京進勝光)
- Kanesada III (兼定 (三代))
- Seki Kanefusa (関兼房)
- Seki Kanetsune (関兼常)
- Kōzukenosuke Kaneshige (上総介兼重)
- Echizen Kanetane I (越前兼植 (初代))
- Echizen Kanenori (越前兼則)
- Aizu Kanesada (会津兼定)
- Echigo no Kami Kunihiro (越後守国儔)
- Yamashiro no Kami Kunikane II (山城守国包 (二代))
- Yamashiro no Daijō Kunitsugu I (山城大椽国次 (初代))
- Okayama Kunimune (岡山国宗)
- Ōyogo Kunishige (大与五国重)
- Ishidō Korekazu I (石堂是一 (初代)) = Musashi Daijō Koreichi I (武蔵大椽是一 (初代))
- Iga no Kami Sadatsugu (伊賀守定次)
- Nanki Shigekuni I (南紀重国)
- Tsuda Ōmi no Kami Sukenao (津田近江守助直)
- Osafune Sukemitsu (長船祐光)
- Yokoyama Sukesada (横山祐定) = Sukesada IX (descendant of Eisho) (九代祐定 (永正の末裔))
- Osafune Tadamitsu (長船忠光)
- Ikkanshi Tadatsuna (一竿子忠綱)
- Settsu no Kami Tadayuki I (摂津守忠行 (初代))
- Mutsu Tadashige (陸奥忠重)
- Sōshū Tsunahiro I (相州綱広 (初代))
- Tsushima no Kami Tsunemitsu (対馬守常光) = Heki Tsunemitsu (日置常光)
- Tango no Kami Naomichi (丹後守直道)
- Osafune Norimitsu I (長船則光 (初代))
- Sukeemon Norimitsu (助右衛門則光)
- Osafune Norimitsu I (長船法光 (初代))
- Osafune Norimitsu II (長船法光 (二代))
- Osafune Hidesuke (長船秀助)
- Ōmi no Kami Hisamichi I (近江守久道 (初代))
- Kanabō Masazane (金房正真)
- Sakakura Masatoshi I (坂倉正利 (初代))
- Sakakura Masatoshi II (坂倉正利 (二代))
- Yamato no Daijō Masanori I (大和大椽正則 (初代))
- Ōshū Masanaga (奥州政長) = Aizu Masanaga (会津政長)
- Heki Mitsuhira (日置光平)
- Sakyō no Shin Munemitsu (左京進宗光)
- Heki Munehiro (日置宗弘)
- Osafune Morikage (長船盛景) = Ōmiya Morikage (大宮盛景)
- Yasutsugu I (康継 (初代))
- Yasutsugu II (康継 (二代))
- Yamato no Kami Yasusada (大和守安定)
- Bitchū no Kami Yasuhiro (備中守康広)
- Takada Yukinaga (高田行長)
- Kyō Yoshimichi I (京吉道 (初代))
- Kyō Yoshimichi II (京吉道 (二代))
- Ōsaka Yoshimichi I (大阪吉道 (初代))
- Ōsaka Yoshimichi II (大阪吉道 (二代))
- Musashi no Kami Yoshikado (武蔵守吉門)
- Ise Daijō Yoshihiro (伊勢大椽吉弘)
- Aoe Tsugunao (備中國住次直作)
- Shizu Kaneuji (志津兼氏)

== Eighty (80) Wazamono ==
The original list of 80 swordsmiths who, based on the cutting ability of their blades, hold the fourth-highest rank of Wazamono (Good Grade):

- (Tsushima no kami) Tachibana Ippō ((対馬守)橘一法) =? Sasaki Ippō II (佐々木一法 (ニ代))
- Tegarayama Ujishige I (手柄山氏重 (初代))Yamato no Daijō Ujishige I (大和大椽藤原氏重)
- Kashū Katsuie I (加州勝家 (初代))
- Kashū Katsuie II (加州勝家 (二代))
- Aizu Kanetomo I (会津兼友 (初代))
- Kanetane (Edo) (兼植 (江戸))
- Musashi no Kami Kanenaka (武蔵守兼中)
- Sakushū Kanekage (作州兼景)
- Tsutsui Kijū (筒井紀充), son of Kanekuni (added below)
- Kunikore (Osaka) (国維 (大坂)) = Sagami no Kami Kunimasa (相模守国維)
- Kawachi no Kami Kunisuke I II III (初二三代河内守国助)
- Yamashiro no Kami Kunikiyo I (山城守国清 (初代))
- Yamashiro no Kami Kunikiyo II (山城守国清 (二代))
- Aizu Kunisada (会津国貞)
- Sagami no Kami Kunitsuna (相模守国綱)
- Obama Kuniyoshi (小浜国義) =? Takai Kuniyoshi (高井国義)
- Kōriyama Kunitake (郡山国武) =? Sugawara Kunitake (菅原国武)
- Suzuki Kaga no Kami Sadanori (鈴木加賀守貞則)
- Izumo no Kami Sadashige (出雲守貞重)
- Kaga no Kami Sadahiro (加賀守貞広)
- Yamato no Daijō Sadayuki (大和大椽貞行)
- Inoue Shinkai (井上真改)
- Doi Shinryō (土肥真了)
- Umetada Shigeyoshi (埋忠重義)
- Harima no Daijō Shigetaka I (播磨大椽重高 (初代))
- Nobukuni Shigekane (信国重包)
- Nobukuni Shigesada (信国重貞) of Nobukuni school
- Takada Shigeyuki (高田重行)
- Maru Tsuda Sukehiro (丸津田助広) =?Tsuda Sōsho Mei Sukehiro (津田草書銘助広), successor of Sukehiro I (Soboro) above.
- Suketaka (Osaka) (助高 (大坂)) = Sesshū Suketaka (摂州助高)
- Sukenobu (Osaka) (助信 (大坂)) = Sesshū jū Minamoto no Sukenobu (摂州住源助信) = Dewa no Kami Sukenobu (出羽守助信)
- Hanabusa Sukekuni (花房祐国) = Bizen no Kami Yūkoku (備前守祐国)
- Harima no Daijō Tadakuni I (播磨大掾忠国 (初代)) = Hizen jū Harima no Daijō Fujiwara no Tadakuni I (肥前住播磨大掾藤原忠国 (初代)) = Hizen Tadakuni I (肥前忠国 (初代))
- Tadayoshi IV (四代忠吉)
- Shinano Daijō Tadakuni I (信濃大掾忠国 (初代)) = Heianjō jū Tadakuni I (平安城住忠国 (初代))
- Tsuguhira I (継平 (初代))
- Shimosaka Tsuguhiro (下阪継広)
- Higo no Kami Teruhiro (肥後守輝広)
- Shitahara Terushige (下原照重)
- Mutsu no Kami Toshinaga I (陸奥守歳長 (初代))
- Yamashiro no Kami Toshinaga I (山城守歳長 (初代))
- Musashi no Kami Tomotsune (武蔵守友常)
- Tsunbo Nagatsuna (聾長綱)
- Takai Nobuyoshi I (高井信吉 (初代))
- Hōki no Kami Nobutaka I (伯耆守信高 (初代))
- Hōki no Kami Nobutaka II (伯耆守信高 (二代))
- Jūrō Saemon Harumitsu (十郎左衛門春光)
- Kinshiro Hisamichi (金四郎久道)
- Yamashiro no Kami Hidetoki I (山城守秀辰 (初代))
- Hiromasa (Settsu) (広政 (摂津)) = Wakasa no Kami Hiromasa (若狭守広政)
- Hōki no Kami Hirotaka (伯耆守汎隆)
- Hōjōji Masahiro (法城寺正弘)
- Etchū no Kami Masatoshi (越中守正俊)
- Hizen Masahiro I (肥前正広 (初代)), disciple of Tadayoshi I above.
- Bitchū no Daijō Masanaga (備中大椽正永)
- Kanabō Masatsugu (金房政次)
- Takada Muneyuki I (高田統行 (初代))
- Shimosaka Munemichi (Munetsugu) (下坂宗道(宗次)) =? Kazusa no Daijō Munemichi (上総大椽宗道)
- Mutsu no Kami Muneshige (陸奥守宗重)
- Motoyuki (Osaka) (本行 (大坂)) = (松葉本行) = Kawachi no Kami Motoyuki (河内守本行)
- Senjuin Morikuni (千手院盛国)
- Tōren Morihisa (東連守久) =? Ishidō Morihisa (石堂守久)
- Yasunaga (Ōsaka, Settsu jū) (康永 (大坂・摂津住)) = Kawachi no Kami Yasunaga (河内守康永)
- Sendai Yasutomo II (仙台安倫 (二代))
- Dewa no Kami Yukihiro (出羽守行広) = Hizen Yukihiro I (肥前行広 (初代))
- Izumo no Daijō Yoshitake I (出雲大椽吉武 (初代))
- Izumo no Daijō Yoshitake II (出雲大椽吉武 (二代))
- Yamato no Kami Yoshimichi I (大和守吉道 (初代))
- Yamato no Kami Yoshimichi II (大和守吉道 (二代))
- Kōzukenosuke Yoshimasa (上野介吉正)
- Yoshikuni Tosa (吉国 (土佐)) = Kōzuke no Kami Yoshikuni (上野守吉国)
- Onizuka Yoshikuni (鬼塚吉国)

== Mixed ==
The following is the category of sword makers who, per the aforementioned listings, produced a mixture of quality: Ōwazamono, Yoki-/Ryōwazamono, or Wazamono. A total of 65 swordsmiths belong to this category:

- Osafune Arimitsu (長船在光)
- Sasaki Ippō I (佐々木一峯 (初代))
- Kashū Ieyoshi (加州家吉)
- Kashū Ietada (加州家忠)
- Seki Kanekuni (関兼国)
- Hachiya Kanesada (蜂屋兼貞)
- Seki Kanetoki (関兼辰)
- Seki Kaneoto (関兼音)
- Seki Kanemichi (関兼道)
- Sagami no Kami Kaneyasu (相模守兼安)
- Kōzuke no Kami Kanesada (上野守兼定)
- Shimousa no Daijō Kanemasa (下総大椽兼正)
- Komatsu Kanemaki (小松兼巻)
- Tegai Kanesada (手掻包定)
- Kawachi no Kami Tsutsusada (河内守包定)
- Naminohira Kiyosuke (波平清佐)
- Akasaka Senjuin Kuninaga (赤坂千手院国長)
- Uda Kunifusa (宇多国房)
- Satsuma Kunihira (薩摩国平)
- Kawashima Kunihira (川島国平)
- Hōjōji Kuniyoshi (法城寺国吉)
- Matsuyama Kuniteru (松山国輝)
- Yamato no Kami Kuniyuki (大和守国行)
- Nisshū Kunitomi (日州国富)
- Namihira Shigeyoshi (波平重吉)
- Nanki Shigekuni II (南紀重国 (二代))
- Iga Shizumasa (伊賀鎮政)
- Seki Jumyō (関寿命)
- Musashi Sukechika (武蔵助鄰)
- Dewa no Kami Sukeshige (出羽守助重)
- Shichibe Yusada (七兵衛祐定)
- Etchū no Kami Takahira (越中守高平)
- Echigo no Kami Tadamichi (越後守忠道)
- Mutsu no Kami Tameyasu I (陸奥守為康 (初代))
- Shimosaka Tametoshi (下阪為利)
- Sōshuū Tsunaie (相州綱家)
- Osafune Tsuneie I (長船経家 (初代))
- Osafune Tsuneie II (長船経家 (二代))
- Mutsu no Kami Terumasa (陸奥守輝政)
- Takada Teruyuki (高田輝行)
- Seki Nagatoshi (関長俊)
- Settsu no Kami Nagashige I (摂津守永重 (初代))
- Osafune Hisamitsu (長船久光)
- Kōzuke no Kami Hisakuni (上野守久国)
- Senjuin Hironaga (千手院広長)
- Aki Hirotaka I (安芸広隆 (初代))
- Shinano no Kami Hirokane I (信濃守弘包 (初代))
- Namihira Hiroyasu (波平寛安)
- Dōtanuki Masakuni (同田貫正国)
- Mihara Masachika (三原正近)
- Ishimichi Masatoshi (石道正俊)
- Bungo no Kami Shōzen (豊後守正全)
- Sagami no Kami Masatsune I (相模守政常 (初代))
- Wakasa no Kami Michitoki (若狭守道辰)
- Shimousa no Daijō Muneyoshi (下総大椽宗吉)
- Taira Morikata (平盛方)
- Sōshū Yasuharu (相州康春)
- Shimohara Yasushige I (下原康重 (初代))
- Yamato no Kami Yasuyuki (大和守安行)
- Fujishima Yukimitsu (藤島行光)
- Darani Yoshiie (陀羅尼吉家)
- Harima no Kami Yoshinari (播摩守吉成)
- Sanjō Yoshikuni (三条義国)
- Osafune Yoshimitsu (長船賀光)

== In popular culture ==
In the hit manga One Piece, so-called meitō (名刀; "famous swords/blades") are prominently featured: bladed weapons (usually - but not strictly - swords) forged by master craftsmen and wielded by powerful pirates and Marines alike. The finest of these fall into a Wazamono grading system, classifying them into four grades that are directly inspired by those defined in the Japanese Kaihō Kenjaku (although notably ranking the swords themselves, rather than their smiths). Namely, there are 12 Saijō Ōwazamono blades, 21 Ōwazamono blades, 50 Ryōwazamono blades, and an unknown number of low-ranking Wazamono blades. One of the main characters, Roronoa Zoro, is notable for wielding three meitō katana at all times - should circumstances allow it - by holding one in his mouth. Other noteworthy characters in this subject are the smiths who make these weapons, many of which happen to be katana.
