= List of Tenjho Tenge episodes =

The anime series Tenjho Tenge was directed by Toshifumi Kawase, animated by Madhouse, and produced by TV Asahi and Avex Mode, the animation division of the Avex group of companies. The twenty-four episodes were originally aired weekly on TV Asahi in Japan on Thursdays from April 1, 2004, to September 16, 2004. These episodes were made into eight-volume DVD box sets. Two additional episodes were broadcast by TV Asahi in Japan on March 16, 2005, and released in the form of an original video animation named Tenjho Tenge: Ultimate Fight. The anime follows closely to its source material up to the manga's eighth volume with the exception of the sexual content which was toned down. The anime has been dubbed into English, French, German and the Tagalog language. The anime series has been licensed for the English language by Geneon Entertainment, and has released all episodes except the DVD special named Tenjho Tenge: The Past Chapter, which is the back-story told through flashbacks in the second half of the anime television series condensed into the size of four episodes. The series was broadcast in the United States by the cable channel Fuse.

== Episode list ==
No.	Title	Directed by	Written by	Original release date	English air date
1	"Sanctuary"; Transliteration: "Seiiki" (Japanese: 聖域)	Ryūichi Kimura	Toshiki Inoue	April 1, 2004	January 17, 2007
Souichiro Nagi and Bob Makihara arrive at Toudou Academy, planning to rule the school by defeating anybody that get in their way just as they have done at their previous schools. They soon learn that this is no ordinary school when Maya Natsume flings Souichiro out of the school window. Souichiro crashes through the roof of the Juken Club and sees Aya Natsume naked while showering. She then kisses him and proposes out of the blue, much to his embarrassment. Although Aya is adhering to the ancient Natsume tradition that the women in the family would marry the first man they revealed themselves to, this causes much annoyance for Souichiro.
2	"Defeat"; Transliteration: "Haiboku" (Japanese: 敗北)	Kazuya Komai	Toshiki Inoue	April 8, 2004	January 18, 2007
Souichiro challenges Masataka Takayanagi to a fight after witnessing his surprising strength. Takayanagi goes easy on Souichiro at first, but goes all-out when Souichiro tricks him. While dealing with his loss, Souichiro remembers how he would beat up other students who teased him as a kid. The antics of Souichiro and Bob catch the attention of Tsutomu Ryuuzaki, a member of the Executive Council, which keeps the order in the school and punishes the students that do not follow the rules. When Souichiro goes to see Bob at his apartment, they are unaware that Tsutomu is all fired up with a devious plan.
3	"Executioner"; Transliteration: "Shikkōnin" (Japanese: 執行人)	Kōji Aritomi	Kazuhiko Inukai	April 15, 2004	January 21, 2007
With Bob's motorcycle mysteriously burnt up in flames, Souichiro and Bob race to the laundromat to protect Bob's girlfriend Chiaki Kounoike from the culprit. It just so happens to be Tsutomu, who severely injured Chiaki before calling Maya and Aya to tell them that the boys will be punished. Aya, who has awakened, rushes to the laundromat to find Souichiro and Bob, but not in time, as Tsutomu leaves her saying that the boys would soon face expulsion. After being defeated, Souichiro and Bob eventually decide to join the Juken Club. To return the favor, Maya defeats Tsutomu for her new members, with their expulsion revoked.
4	"Suspicion"; Transliteration: "Ginen" (Japanese: 疑念)	Ryūichi Kimura	Kazuhiko Inukai	April 22, 2004	January 22, 2007
Maya trains Souichiro and Bob during Golden Week. After being forced to fast during his training, Souichiro discovers how to execute the backhand technique. Meanwhile, Kōji Sagara, another enforcer of the Executive Council, is sent to rigorously punish Tsutomu for not fulfilling his orders. Aya notices a stronger aura inside of Souichiro after a day of training. However, she becomes worried that her sister is getting too close to Souichiro, whom she still plans on marrying, despite his constant rebuffs.
5	"Punishment"; Transliteration: "Seisai" (Japanese: 制裁)	Yukihiro Miyamoto	Kazuhiko Inukai	April 29, 2004	January 23, 2007
The Juken Club goes bowling on their day off. Aya, now very concerned, has a vision that Souichiro and Maya were kissing the previous night before during their training. When the club is split up, Maya is soon ambushed by Emi Isuzu, vice president of the Executive Council, in the restroom, prompting Maya to face her in a duel. Aya is faced with Shirō Tagami, another member of the Executive Council. Masataka takes on several council members, so that Bob and Chiaki can escape. Souichiro later runs into Kōji, who blocks the exit.
6	"Illusion"; Transliteration: "Gen'ei" (Japanese: 幻影)	Kenichi Kawamura	Kazuhiko Inukai	May 6, 2004	January 24, 2007
The fight between the Juken Club and the Executive Council continues, as the former fares well against the latter. Souichiro seems to be much stronger than Kōji, repeatedly jabbing him in the face. Masataka easily defeats some of the council members, while Maya effortlessly dodges Emi's blade attacks. However, Aya suffers a fatal blow by Shirō, who modified his staff to unleash his full power. Kōji noticed a strange aura surrounding Souichiro, urging him to step up his game. Bob tries to hide Chiaki in the locker room, only to encounter more council members. After Maya counters all of Emi's discreet blade attacks, Emi reveals her true form, expanding into a body made of blades, which Maya is unable to shield against.
7	"Breakthrough"; Transliteration: "Gekiha" (Japanese: 撃破)	Hiroyuki Tsuchiya	Kazuhiko Inukai	May 13, 2004	January 25, 2007
Maya manages to survive the surprise attack, leaving Emi in the restroom and making her way towards Souichiro. Meanwhile, Souichiro attempts to use the backhand technique on Kōji, but fails. When Maya find them, she gives Souichiro the advice of choosing his attacks wisely before she passes out. Souichiro struggles against Kōji's grappling moves, even when he tries to punch Kōji in the stomach directly. When Kōji pins him down, Souichiro astonishingly executes the backhand technique on Kōji's leg to lift himself off, then defeats him off with one final punch. After Masataka defeats several council members, he helps Bob and Chiaki out of the locker room, but the battle is not over yet.
8	"Dragon's Eye"; Transliteration: "Ryūgan" (Japanese: 龍眼)	Kōji Aritomi	Natsuko Takahashi	May 20, 2004	January 26, 2007
Mitsuomi Takayanagi, the president of the Executive Council, revealed to be Masataka's older brother, arrive on the scene. Bob tries to attack Mitsuomi, but he is no match. Mitsuomi, impressed with his potential strength, offers Bob to train under him. However, Bob declines, through Chiaki's motivation, and challenges Mitsuomi to a fight instead. Meanwhile, Aya has awakened and nearly kills Shirō during their fight. Maya tells Souichiro that he must save Aya from being consumed by her awakened state. Aya expresses how overwhelmed she was mercilessly using her power to kill someone, but Souichiro tells that she needs to be strong enough to win against herself. With Bob defeated by Mitsuomi's own hands, Souichiro is now enraged.
9	"Enforcement"; Transliteration: "Shukusei" (Japanese: 粛正)	Mitsuyuki Masuhara	Natsuko Takahashi	May 27, 2004	January 29, 2007
The battle between Souichiro and Mitsuomi has begun. Even though Mitsuomi easily defeats him, Souichiro gets back up every time no matter how hard Mitsuomi tries. During this time, it is later revealed that Mitsuomi and Maya used to be a couple, and that he still desires to renew their relationship. Bunshichi Tawara interrupts the fight to prevent any further tension between the two. It is shown that Shinobu Kagurazaka was fighting Masataka, only for Mitsuomi to end the fight for him. With the members of the Juken Club all spent, Chiaki, who witnessed the exchange between Maya and Mitsuomi earlier, accuses Maya of using the club just to get revenge on an old boyfriend, demanding to know what is going on.
10	"Memory"; Transliteration: "Kioku" (Japanese: 記憶)	Minami Akitsu	Kazuhiko Inukai	June 3, 2004	January 30, 2007
Two years ago, Maya, who was obsessed with getting stronger, loses a fight against Mitsuomi. Shin Natsume, leader of the Katana Group back then, comes to retrieve Mitsuomi, who begins to fall in love with her. After the entrance ceremony starting the school year, Mitsuomi finds Maya outside, who vows to win their next match someday. There have been incidences that an unknown killer is taking out members of the Katana Group. Later, Maya picks a fight with a student named Masayuki Sanada, who was responsible for this, but Maya is unable to fight back. When Masayuki approaches Shin, the latter punctures his stomach, allowing Maya to finish him off. Mana Kuzunoha, Shin's girlfriend, uses acupuncture to allow Masayuki to recover, much to Mitsuomi's relief. Mana later has an affair with Mitsuomi, as both of them realize that the relationship between Shin and Maya is that of lovers rather than of siblings.
11	"One With An Unusual Talent"; Transliteration: "Inōsha" (Japanese: 異能者)	Kōtarō Miyake	Kazuhiko Inukai	June 10, 2004	January 31, 2007
At night, Maya finds out that from Aya that Shin has taken the Reiki, the ceremonial chokutō encased in the family room, with him. Bunshichi lets Mitsuomi know that Mana is spreading word that they have been spending a lot of time together. Meanwhile, Shin is using the family katana to seek revenge for his fallen members. Bunshichi contacts Mitsuomi from the hospital, saying that a student named Ishimatsu fell prey to a "katana hunter". Mana, who slept with Mitsuomi, gives him a present before he leaves, which contains earrings and a flash drive. Mitsuomi and Bunshichi watch its content, which shows footage of Mana spending time with Shin, but after they see themselves in the recording, they then witness how insane Shin was back then. It is revealed that Mana took the role of Shin's girlfriend to record his actions. Moreover, it was because of the Reiki that brought on his uncontrolled aura in the first place.
12	"Darkness"; Transliteration: "Ankoku" (Japanese: 暗黒)	Kazuya Komai	Toshiki Inoue	June 17, 2004	February 1, 2007
While she walks in during his training, Maya catches eye on Mitsuomi's shaking fists. Mitsuomi explains that he first wanted to fight Shin one-on-one, but he now wants to avoid conflict with Shin. It turns out that Maya was the "katana hunter" all along, since she wanted to get rid of the members of the group that Shin has originally started. Bunshichi, finding out about that the members were badly injured on scene, is having trouble trying to find Shin, thinking he is behind this. When Bunshichi notices that Emi has been following him, he chases her on motorcycle, but loses her by a passing semi-trailer truck. Shin is called to a meeting with Dōgen Takayanagi at a park, much to Mana's worry. When Bunshichi corners Emi, a car attempts to ram him, but he unleashes his full power to destroy it.
13	"Magical Power"; Transliteration: "Maryoku" (Japanese: 魔力)	Hiroyuki Tsuchiya	Kazuhiko Inukai	June 24, 2004	February 2, 2007
In the hospital, Maya and Mitsuomi need to find Shin, but when Maya leave, Mitsuomi struggles with a paralyzing fear. Bunshichi takes an unconscious Emi with and hail a taxicab. However, Bunshichi finds himself surrounded by black cars under Fu Chi'en during the ride. Shin claims that the Reiki called out to him to protect Maya. Bunshichi arrives at the park and begins to fight Shin, but the power of the Reiki is too much for Bunshichi to handle. A crazed Shin repeatedly stabs Bunshichi as he laughs hysterically.
14	"Hellfire"; Transliteration: "Gōka" (Japanese: 業火)	Kōji Aritomi	Kazuhiko Inukai	July 1, 2004	February 5, 2007
When Mana tells Shin to cease and hand over the Reiki, this gives Bunshichi the opportunity to fight back, since Shin is weak without the Reiki. However, even when Shin is defeated, he begs to have the Reiki back, comparing himself to a moth wandering in the darkness searching for the flame, comparing Maya to its light. In the hospital, Mitsuomi visits Bunshichi, who says that Shin is always trying to look out for Maya. Meanwhile, Maya visits Shin, who does not want to leave her anymore.
15	"Yin & Yang"; Transliteration: "In'yō" (Japanese: 陰陽)	Norio Kashima	Kazuhiko Inukai	July 8, 2004	February 6, 2007
Shin tells Mitsuomi that he wants to have a farewell party for the Katana Group. Mitsuomi's paralyzing fear has grown, feeling as if a monster is lurking inside of him. Mana lets a stubborn Shin know that her assignment of collecting his data is now completed. Maya is aware of Mitsuomi's internal feelings, as she relates to them the same way. Mana later tells Maya she convinced Shin to start the Katana Group in the first place in order to gain bright friendships with his members, but he did not want anyone to know his true dark nature. Mitsuomi, who was eavesdropping, now understands what Shin was going through. Later at night, Mitsuomi races Shin on their motorcycles by means of a farewell party, as Mitsuomi knows that he would be the one to end Shin's pain and suffering.
16	"Conclusion"; Transliteration: "Kiketsu" (Japanese: 帰結)	Minami Akitsu	Daisuke Ishibashi	July 15, 2004	February 7, 2007
After Maya finishes her story, the other club members are in awestruck when they return to their homes. The next morning, the Juken Club returns to school, having gained popularity after their battles against the Executive Council in the bowling alley. Maya meets with the school principal, while Souichiro and Bob fight a student named Kanakita Ryusen, who slashes at them with his katana. Nonetheless, the two defeat him in a collaborative effort. The principal eventually concedes with having Maya expelled, but she actually volunteered to do this in order to protect her club. Souichiro and Bob break into the Executive Council's headquarters and demand to see Mitsuomi, while Maya realizes that Aya has stolen the Reiki from the storage room.
17	"True Motive"; Transliteration: "Shin'i" (Japanese: 真意)	Kōtarō Miyake	Daisuke Ishibashi	July 22, 2004	February 8, 2007
Souichiro and Bob attempt to fight their way past Bunshichi and Emi, but they clearly have not the strength to do so. Aya, accompanied by Masataka, witnesses the fight from the outside in her awakened state, but she is heartbroken when Souichiro confesses his love for Maya. Bunshichi, explaining that the previous Executive Council members are fighting for what they believe in, is rather disappointed that Souichiro would want to expel himself just because of his love for Maya. On the school roof, Aya gets all her tears out, but jumps off the roof to the ground and walks away when Maya calls out for her. Mitsuomi, during his rigorous training with a bull, tells Emi that the Juken Club must be within the reach of the Executive Council. However, Emi shocks Mitsuomi when he learns that the Reiki is now in Aya's possession.
18	"Sympathy"; Transliteration: "Kyōmei" (Japanese: 共鳴)	Shinya Hanai	Kazuhiko Inukai	July 29, 2004	February 9, 2007
Maya and Mitsuomi team up to search on school grounds for Aya, who has the cursed sword Reiki. Unbeknownst to them, Masataka finds Aya, who asks to stay at his house overnight, cooking for him as a favor. Soon, Maya and Mistuomi realize that Aya is nowhere to be found on school grounds, assuming that she has returned home. Masataka, getting carried away with his thoughts, tries to get a peek at Aya when she is showering, but she notices she starts crying. When she finishes showering, she collapses with fever. At night, she dreams that her brother Shin, in the form of a ghost, wants to take the Reiki away from her, warning her that she must face her own powers if wielding such a sword. When Bunshichi drops Souichiro and Bob off to Chiaki, she questions him regarding the past.
19	"Start Up"; Transliteration: "Kidōver" (Japanese: 起動)	Minami Akitsu	Kazuhiko Inukai	August 12, 2004	February 12, 2007
This takes place when Shin and Mitsuomi come back to school the next day after their farewell party, which a very upset Bunshichi welcomes them back. The three of them start a club named the Juken Club, but they need two more members. The academy will soon be holding preliminary matches for the Election Tournament. Mitsuomi decides to invite Maya to the club, but she declines. After challenging her to a series of games, he ends up in a draw with her each time. Maya tells the story of how she was assigned to watch over the Reiki ever since she was a child. She explaining how Shin was forced to confinement after daring to wield its overwhelming power, but he killed his parents upon his release. Although Maya is worried about Shin, Mitsuomi says otherwise, finally persuading her to join the club. The next day, Maya convinces a student named Kagesada Sugano to be a part of the club as well.
20	"Stratagem"; Transliteration: "Bōryaku" (Japanese: 謀略)	Mitsuyuki Masuhara	Daisuke Ishibashi	August 19, 2004	February 13, 2007
The preliminary, rather free-for-all, matches of the tournament get underway, and the Juken Club must prepare for any other club that attacks them. However, Maya and Mitsuomi do most of the fighting, while Bunshichi relaxes, much to Kagesada's dismay. Meanwhile, Shin pays a visit to Dōgen, who asks him to do a favor, returning the Reiki back to him, but Shin no longer wants to follow Dōgen's orders. Both and Emi and Mana are soon captured by Fu Chi'en, and Maya is later held captive by him also.
21	"Accidental Discharge"; Transliteration: "Bōhatsu" (Japanese: 暴発)	Shiyō Kamanaka	Daisuke Ishibashi	August 26, 2004	February 14, 2007
Fu Chi'en takes Maya captive in order to force Shin to comply with Dōgen's demands. Upon seeing her unconscious and partially nude, Shin awakens and attacks Fu Chi'en's bodyguards. Mana breaks free from the ropes, thanks to Emi, and runs off to find Mitsuomi. Fu Chi'en attacks Shin with his shocking powers, but Shin manages to tear both of Fu Chi'en's hands off. Shin then goes after Emi, subduing her with her own blades. When Maya wakes up and calls out for Shin, Mitsuomi appears and tries to stop the berserk Shin, but Shin sends a blast of energy into Mitsuomi, severely causing internal impact. Although Mitsuomi turned out okay, Maya is very concerned for his health, something she cannot forgive Shin of causing. It is shown that while he was doing maintenance on his motorcycle, Mitsuomi coughs up blood due to the blast of energy.
22	"Determination"; Transliteration: "Ketsui" (Japanese: 決意)	Kōji Aritomi	Kazuhiko Inukai	September 2, 2004	February 15, 2007
As the finals of the tournament draw close, the Juken Club must fight a club of five high ranking members specifically formed to defeat the Juken Club. Maya confronts Shin concerning what he did to Mitsuomi. Shin responds by saying that it was destined to happen, comparing that event to a river being formed. During the finals, Mitsuomi joins Bunshichi and Kagesada in the stadium against the opposing club. Much to a surprise, Mitsuomi defeats all five of them unassisted, calculating three minutes total. Mitsuomi learns from Mana that his heart rate has increased rapidly, sharpening his mental and physical abilities, but at the consequence of his life span being shortened. In the hospital, Fu Chi'en has recovered and is given blades as prosthetic hands, but he is suddenly killed by Shin on his way out. Mitsuomi goes to see Maya to ask where Shin has been, but she sadly tells him not to talk to her anymore.
23	"Curse"; Transliteration: "Jubaku" (Japanese: 呪縛)	Kōtarō Miyake	Kazuhiko Inukai	September 9, 2004	February 16, 2007
Mitsuomi meets with Mana and tells her not to abandon him, since he might have only a few years left of his life. Meanwhile, Shin takes Maya to the beach to chill and relax. Two months later, the Juken Club meet up together for a group photo to celebrate their victory, though at first Bunshichi notices that everyone had a gloomy look on their faces and he manages to get them all to cheer up. Later, Mitsuomi fights Shin for the position of president of the Executive Council, and Mana prevents the others from butting in. Mitsuomi's frightening power has left Shin down on his knees, who is not able to counterattack. When Mitsuomi attempts a final blow, Mana intercepts and ends the match. However, Shin blasts through Mana to initiate a surprise attack on Mitsuomi. Shin then realizes what he has done as he hears Mana's last dying words, deciding to take his own life with one of her acupuncture needles.
24	"Vicissitudes"; Transliteration: "Ruten" (Japanese: 流転)	Kazuya Komai	Kazuhiko Inukai	September 16, 2004	February 19, 2007
Mitsuomi crushes Dōgen's dream of making him the "true martial artist", hiring Fu Chi'en's men to shoot down Dōgen's office. Mitsuomi, later tells Maya that there are a few dozen students with supernatural powers through his investigation. When he leaves, Maya is covered with tears. In the present, Maya and Mitsuomi try to retrieve the Reiki from Aya. Emi tries to stop Aya, but is quickly repelled. When Souichiro and Bob arrive on the scene, Bob takes Maya away before Souichiro engages in a fight against Mitsuomi. Through the Reiki, Aya witnesses the fight from the roof, but the power of this sword unleashes a blast onto the two boys. As Mitsuomi repeatedly punches Souichiro on the ground, Aya throws the sword back to Maya. Aya tells Souichiro to stand up, but Maya hits him back onto the ground. Maya stops the fight and convinces Mitsuomi to wait till the preliminaries the following month to settle the score. Aya, feeling ignored, jumps from the roof calling out for Souichiro.

== OVAs ==
No.	Title	Directed by	Written by	Original release date	English air date
1	"Dragon's Fist"; Transliteration: "Ryūken" (Japanese: 龍拳)	Minami Akitsu	Kazuhiko Inukai	March 16, 2005	February 20, 2007
Souichiro Nagi is sent off with Aya Natsume for special training for the tournament. He is surprised to see his mother Makiko Nagi as well as Dōgen Takayanagi there. Annoyed, Souichiro decides to leave, taking Aya with him. On his way home, Souichiro thinks he could take on Aya any day, but Aya wields her sword right in front of him to prove otherwise, having him realize how weak he really is. Suddenly, they are attacked by several men wearing masks. Meanwhile, Bob Makihara is training with Maya Natsume, dragging her while sprinting with a tire attached to a rope. Souichiro channels his energy and transforms into a stronger self, changing his hair from blonde to black only for a moment. The men are actually under Dōgen, who have ties with his family. Makiko tells Souichiro that he is just a fragment of the universe and vice versa. Elsewhere, Bunshichi Tawara tells Mitsuomi Takayanagi to stop holding on to all what happened two years ago. While riding his motorcycle, Mitsuomi later gets into an accident due to a stray cat. Aya scolds Maya for using Souichiro only to fight Mitsuomi for her own benefits, running away in tears.
2	"Germination"; Transliteration: "Hōga" (Japanese: 萌芽)	Kenichi Kawamura	Kazuhiko Inukai	March 16, 2005	February 21, 2007
Mitsuomi, released from the hospital, believes that his time is running out. Bunshichi relays a message to Souichiro that Mitsuomi wants to fight him. Meanwhile, Aya interrupts class and challenges Maya to a fight after school, writing this message on the chalkboard. However, the two girls take the fight outside the classroom. After a long chase around the school, Aya expresses how she is not willing to take losing Souichiro lying down, wanting to become stronger. When the two girls each draw their swords, Bob prevents them from fighting but Souichiro then encourages Aya to do her best and win the match. Later at night, Mitsuomi challenges Souichiro to a match before the preliminaries. Although Maya tries to stop them, Souichiro transforms into his altered state, but he is still not strong enough. Suddenly, Souichiro transforms even further, his body covered in gold. He punches Mitsuomi back against the wall, but before he could give the finishing move, Souichiro stiffens and collapses due to the amount of energy he used. The next day, although Aya knows how much affection Souichiro has for Maya, she strives to become even stronger to prove her love for him.
