= Jushi =

Jushi may refer to:

- Jushi Kingdom, in modern Turpan, Xinjiang, China
- Householder (Buddhism) or jushi (居士)
- Jushi Mataza Tsumuji, a character in the manga series Tenjho Tenge
