= Sugari no Ontachi =

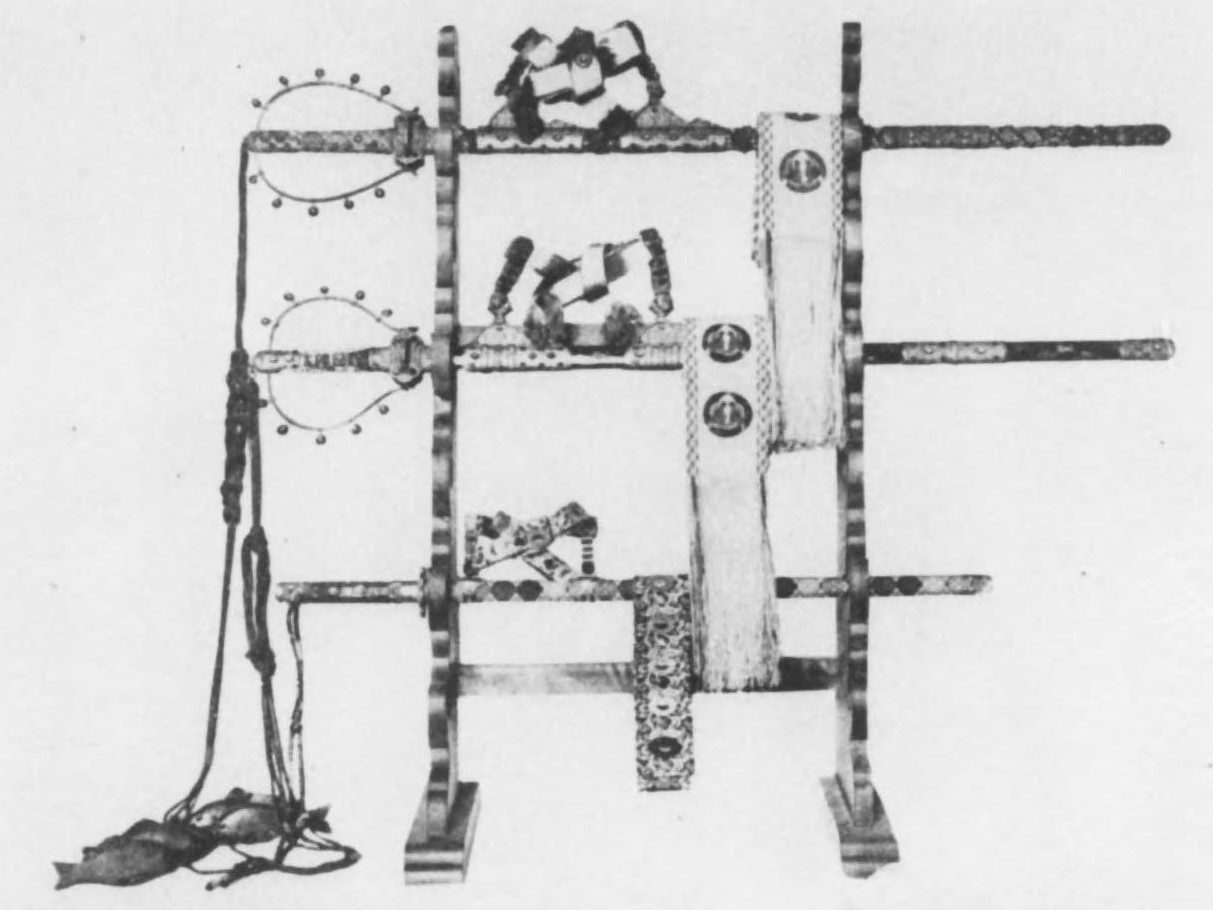
Tamamaki no Ontachi (玉纏御太刀, top), Sugari no Ontachi (須賀利御太刀, middle), and Kondō zukuri no Ontachi (金銅造御太刀, bottom), newly made for the Sikinen Sengu (式年遷宮, rebuilding the shrine) of 1889.

Sugari No Ontachi (須賀利御太刀) is a Japanese sword. It is one of the important sacred treasures of the Inner Shrine, Naikū (内宮) of Ise Grand Shrine (伊勢神宮, Ise Jingū), the Grand Head of Shinto shrines in Japan. Kotai Jingu Gishikicho (皇太神宮儀式帳) describes Sugari (須賀利) as "須賀流". "須賀流" is an archaic word for bee or wasp, which is thought to have been named for its beautiful decoration like a bee or wasp.

Since the reign of Empress Jitō at the end of the 7th century, Ise Grand Shrine has continued the tradition of Shikinen Sengu (式年遷宮), in which the shrine buildings are rebuilt every 20 years on an adjacent site with the same specifications. This tradition is based on the idea of Tokowaka (常若) in Shinto, that new objects have stronger divine power. There are 1576 sacred treasures that are renewed every 20 years, and Sugari no Ontachi is the most important sacred treasure along with Tamamaki no Ontachi (玉纏御太刀) in the sword category.

The Sugari no Ontachi was first described in the Kotai Jingu Gishikicho (皇太神宮儀式帳) compiled in 804, and it is believed that new decorations were added to the scabbard and sword fittings at each subsequent Shikinen Sengu to complete the design as we know it today. The scabbards and hanging belts of Sugari no Ontachi and Tamamaki no Ontachi were made in a characteristic style in the Heian period after the end of the 8th century.

A part of the name of Sugari no Ontachi", "Tachi" (太刀) is characterized by a curved blade, but the shape of the Sugari no Ontachi is similar to a straight Chokutō (直刀). As Sugari no Ontachi is used for religious services, it is much more gorgeous than swords for actual fighting. The exterior is decorated with fine gold sculptures, multiple bells, crystal, glass, agate and amber, and two crested ibis feathers.

== Modern age ==
At the 61st Shikinen Sengu in 1993, the Japanese crested ibis was on the verge of extinction and it was thought that it would be impossible to obtain feathers, but the feathers kept by donors were taken over and they were secured until the 62nd Shikinen Sengu in 2013.

Until the Meiji period, the sacred treasures were made as an offering to Kami in the main hall for 20 years, and then kept in the treasure house for another 20 years to serve as a model for the manufacturing of sacred treasures in later years, and then burned or buried in the shrine grounds. After the opening of the Jingu Chokokan Museum (神宮徴古館), the old sacred treasures removed from the treasure house exhibited at special exhibitions in the Jingu Chokokan Museum and other museums. Recently, from October 2015 to October 2016, the old Sugari no Ontachi, which had been replaced, was displayed together with 9 swords including Tamamaki no Ontachi at Jingu Chokokan Museum. Also, old sacred treasures removed from the treasure house may be granted as an Imperial gift to other shrines.
