= Kara-tachi sword with gilded silver fittings and inlay =

8th century Japanese sword

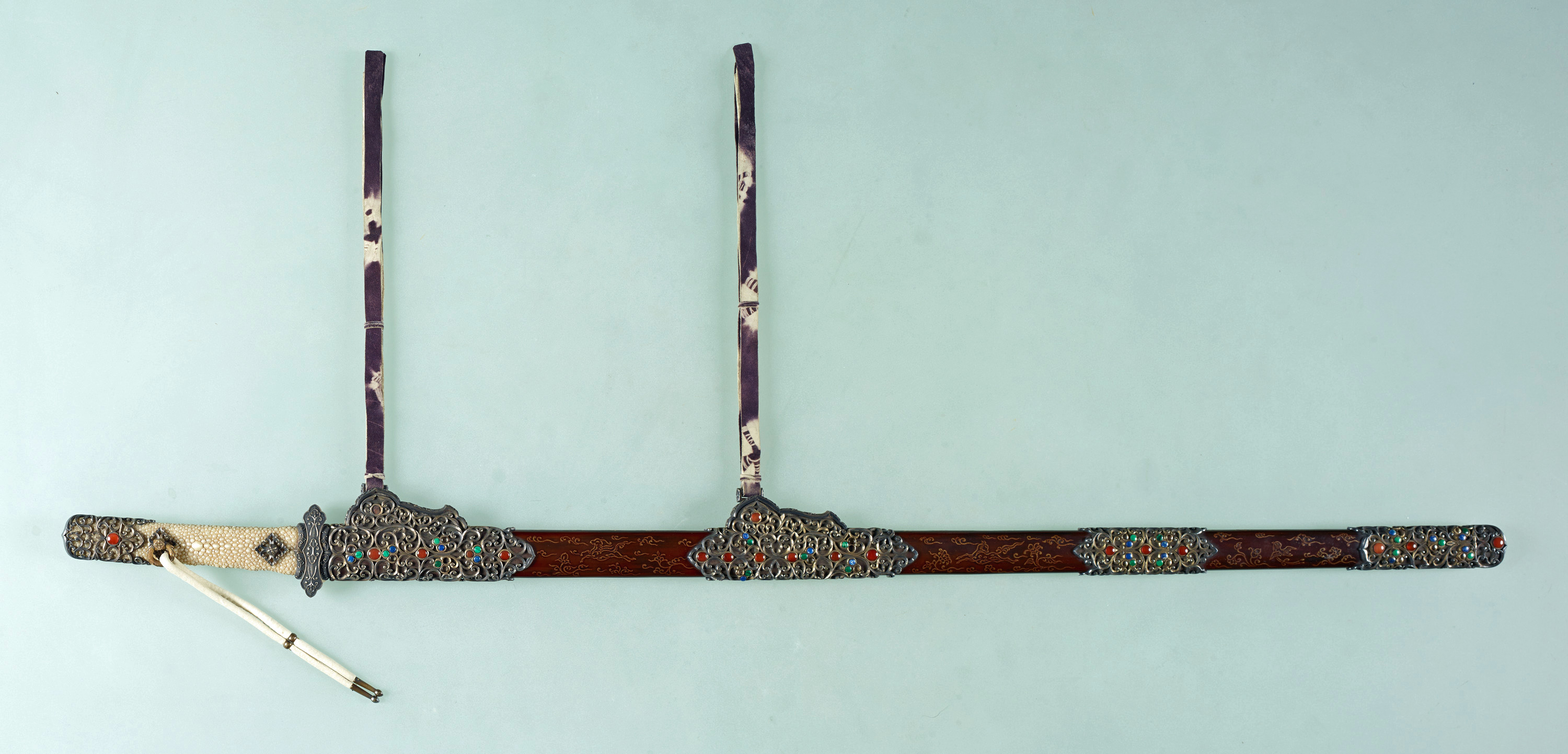
Kara-tachi sword with gilded silver fittings and inlay, imitation made in the 19th century, by Sōkichi Tamura.

The Kara-tachi sword with gilded silver fittings and inlay (金銀鈿荘唐大刀, kin gin den kazari no kara-tachi) is an 8th century Japanese sword in the chokutō (直刀; lit. 'straight sword') style. It was one of Emperor Shōmu's favorite swords and was handed down in the Shōsōin Repository.

Because it is an imperial treasure, it is not open to the public, but is sometimes exhibited at the Shōsōin exhibition held in Nara Prefecture every fall.

== Origin ==
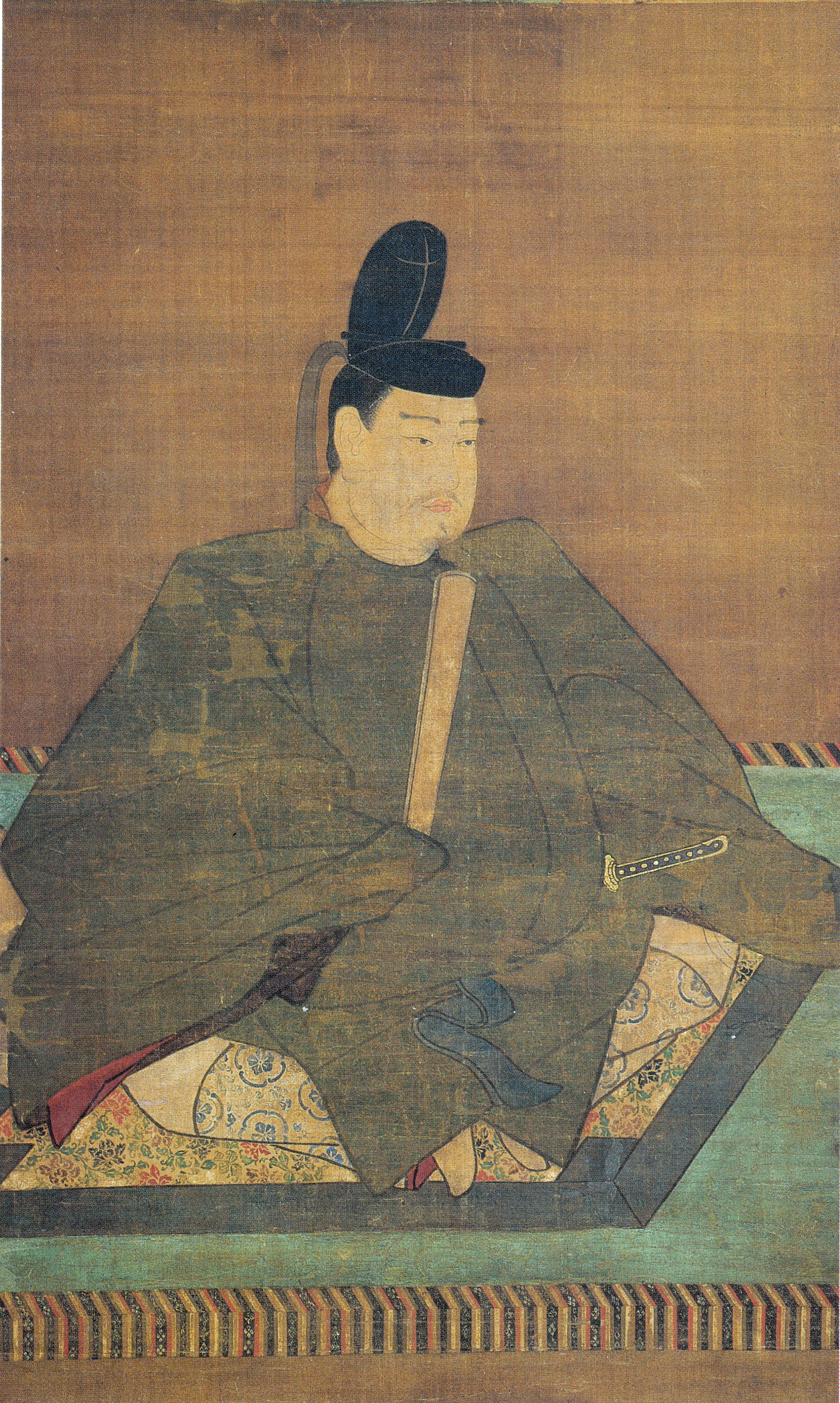
Emperor Shōmu

According to the Tōdai-ji Offering Book (東大寺献物帳), a list of offerings made by Empress Kōmyō to Tōdai-ji temple after Emperor Shōmu's death, 100 large-scale swords (御大刀壹佰口) were stored in the north storage room (北倉) of the Shōsōin.

These include three double-edged swords (剣), nine kake-hake swords (懸佩刀, lit. 'sword hanging from a belt'), 44 large swords (大刀), 41 large swords in black sheaths (黒作大刀), one side sword (横刀), and two staff swords (杖刀).

The above 44 large swords can be further classified into 13 kara-tachi swords (唐大刀, lit. 'Tang large swords'), 23 large swords, 6 kara style swords (唐様大刀, kara-yō tachi; lit. 'Tang-style large swords'), and 2 koma style large swords (高麗様大刀, lit. 'Goguryeo-style large swords').

Of the 100 large-scale swords mentioned above, 4 double-edged swords and one large sword were removed from the Shōsōin on January 18, 760. In addition, on September 11, 764, 48 large swords and 40 large swords in black sheaths were removed from the Shōsōin, probably due to their use during the Fujiwara no Nakamaro Rebellion. The number of large swords does not match the Tōdai-ji Offering Book, but it may include kake-hake swords and others.

Therefore, of the 100 large-scale swords, 93 had been removed from the Shōsōin by 764, and of the remaining 7, only 1 large sword and 2 staff swords are known to exist, while 4 are missing. However, there are 49 large swords of unknown origin in the middle storage room (中倉) and three large swords in the south storage room (南倉) of the Shōsōin, and it is possible that the large swords originally stored in the north storage room were later returned and mixed up.

The Kara-tachi sword with gilded silver fittings and inlay corresponds to the extant 1 large sword. It is the fourth large sword listed in the catalog of large-scale swords in the Tōdai-ji Offering Book.

金銀鈿荘唐大刀一口

刃長二尺六寸四分 鋒者両刃 鮫皮把作山形
葛形裁文 鞘上末金鏤作 白皮懸 紫皮帯執

黒紫羅帯 緋地高麗錦袋浅緑綾裏

The Kara-tachi sword with gilded silver fittings and inlay: 1

Blade length: 2 shaku 6 sun 4 bu. Sharkskin hilt and mountain-shaped metal fittings on the scabbard.
Vine-shaped patterns. The surface of the scabbard is decorated with Makkinru (末金鏤). Cord made of white leather. Two cords to hang on the belt made of purple leather.
A black-purple thin silk belt. Bag of red Goguryeo brocade. The lining cloth of the bag is a light green twill weave.

Kara-tachi (literally, Tang large sword) used to mean a sword made in Tang China, and kara-yō tachi (literally, Tang style sword) was thought to mean a sword made in Japan in imitation of the Tang large sword. However, since no conclusion has been reached as to whether the kara-tachi's blade and exterior (hilt and scabbard) were made in China or Japan, the term kara-tachi is now interpreted to mean "Tang-style large sword" (唐風の大刀).

== Blade and Exterior ==
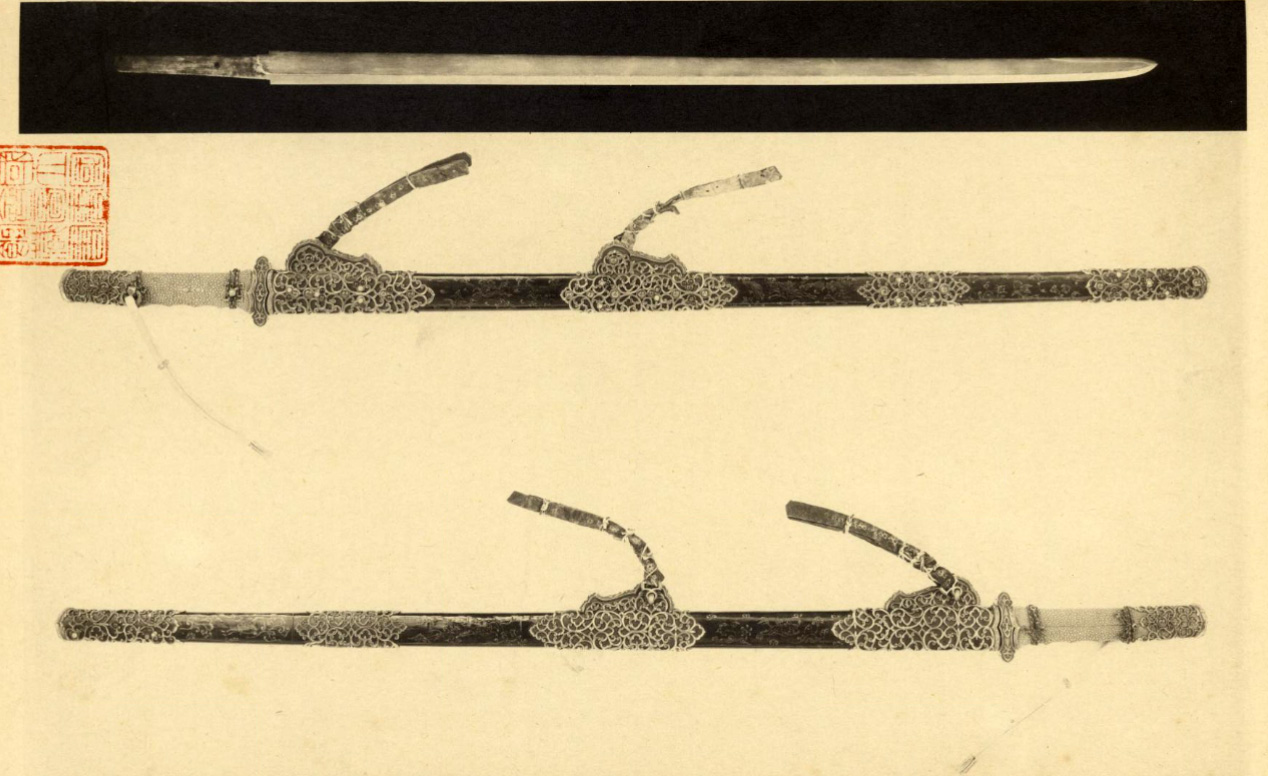
Blade and Exterior

The blade type is kiriha-zukuri (切刃造り), in which the mountain-shaped bulge on the side, called shinogi (鎬), is closer to the cutting edge side of the blade. This type is common in swords of the Nara period. It is a single-edged type called kissaki-moroha-zukuri (鋒両刃造), in which only the tip of the blade is double-edged. A similar example is the Kogarasu Maru. The shape of the blade is a straight sword (直刀, chokutō) with a slightly curved blade. The shape of the mune (棟; opposite the cutting edge) is a chamfered 3-mune type.

The shape of the nakago (茎; hilt side of the blade) is a kurijiri (栗尻) in the shape of a chestnut, with two holes, one for mekugi (目釘; nail to fix hilt and blade) and the other for kake-dōshi (懸通し), through which the kake (懸; cord) is threaded. Although the exterior of the sword is ceremonial in appearance, the excellence of the blade's forging is considered to be unparalleled.

The hilt is wrapped in sharkskin (actually stingray skin), and a metal fitting with an arabesque design in openwork is attached to the end of the hilt. The tsuba (鍔; guard) is decorated with a design of small dots called nanako (魚子; lit. 'fish roe') with an arabesque design in relief on the surface, and a flower-shaped ornamental metal fitting is placed over the hole for a mekugi. The white leather kake (cord) connected to the hilt with a silver ring has been replaced by a repair.

The scabbard is made of wood and lacquered in black lacquer. Three metal fittings are attached to the scabbard and one to the kojiri (鐺; chape of the scabbard), which are openworked with an arabesque pattern similar to that on the pommel of the hilt. Two of these four fittings are each fitted with a mountain-shaped fitting that connects the obitori (帯執り; belt strap). Two purple leather obitori with white patterns are attached to the mountain-shaped fittings.

The metal fittings are all silver with gold plating, most of which has peeled off, and are decorated in places with colored glass and crystal balls, and under the crystal balls are painted in vermilion.

The makkinru (末金鏤; lit. 'Sprinkling gold powder') technique on the scabbard is one of the lacquer techniques and is the same as the maki-e polishing technique used today. The patterns are drawn in lacquer, sprinkled with gold powder, coated with more lacquer, and then polished out with patterns of flowers, clouds, and animals.

The belt and bag that came with the sword were lost and have not been handed down.

== Controversy over the place of production ==
Since the term makkinru is a unique Japanese name that does not exist in China, and since no examples of crafts using this technique can be found in China, there has long been a dispute over whether the scabbard was made in Japan or China.

Kurokawa Mayori interprets makkinru as a technique in which gold is powdered with a rasp and sprinkled over black lacquer to create a pattern, and places it at the origin of maki-e in later Japan. He also assumes that kara-tachi means a sword made in Tang dynasty China, and he considers the Kara-tachi sword with gilded silver fittings and inlay to be made in China, and therefore the makkinru technique was also introduced to Japan from China. Since maki-e, in which pictures are drawn by sprinkling gold powder, does not exist in China, maki-e is assumed to have been created in Japan from makkinru.

On the other hand, Rokkaku Shisui interprets kara-tachi to mean that the blade was made in China and does not refer to the place of production of the entire sword, including the exterior, and argues that the decoration and making of the scabbard are also different from those of the Chinese. He also claims that although there are many paintings in China made by the kondei (金泥; lit. 'gold mud') technique, in which gold powder is dissolved in oil or glue and painted with a brush, there are no paintings in China made by sprinkling gold powder like Japanese maki-e, and that makkinru is also Japanese in origin.

Recent research has shown that the gold powder particles used in the scabbard vary in size and cannot be reproduced using a modern rasp, but can be reproduced using a rasp equivalent to the one found in a carpenter's tool called Ten knives in clustered sheaths (十合鞘御刀子), a treasure of the Shōsōin Repository. It was also revealed that the patterns on the scabbard were not drawn by the kondei technique but by a technique similar to maki-e.

Recent research has shown that 95% of the Shōsōin treasures are thought to be of Japanese origin, although they are decorated with foreign designs, it is still unclear whether the Kara-tachi sword with gilded silver fittings and inlay was of Japanese or foreign origin.

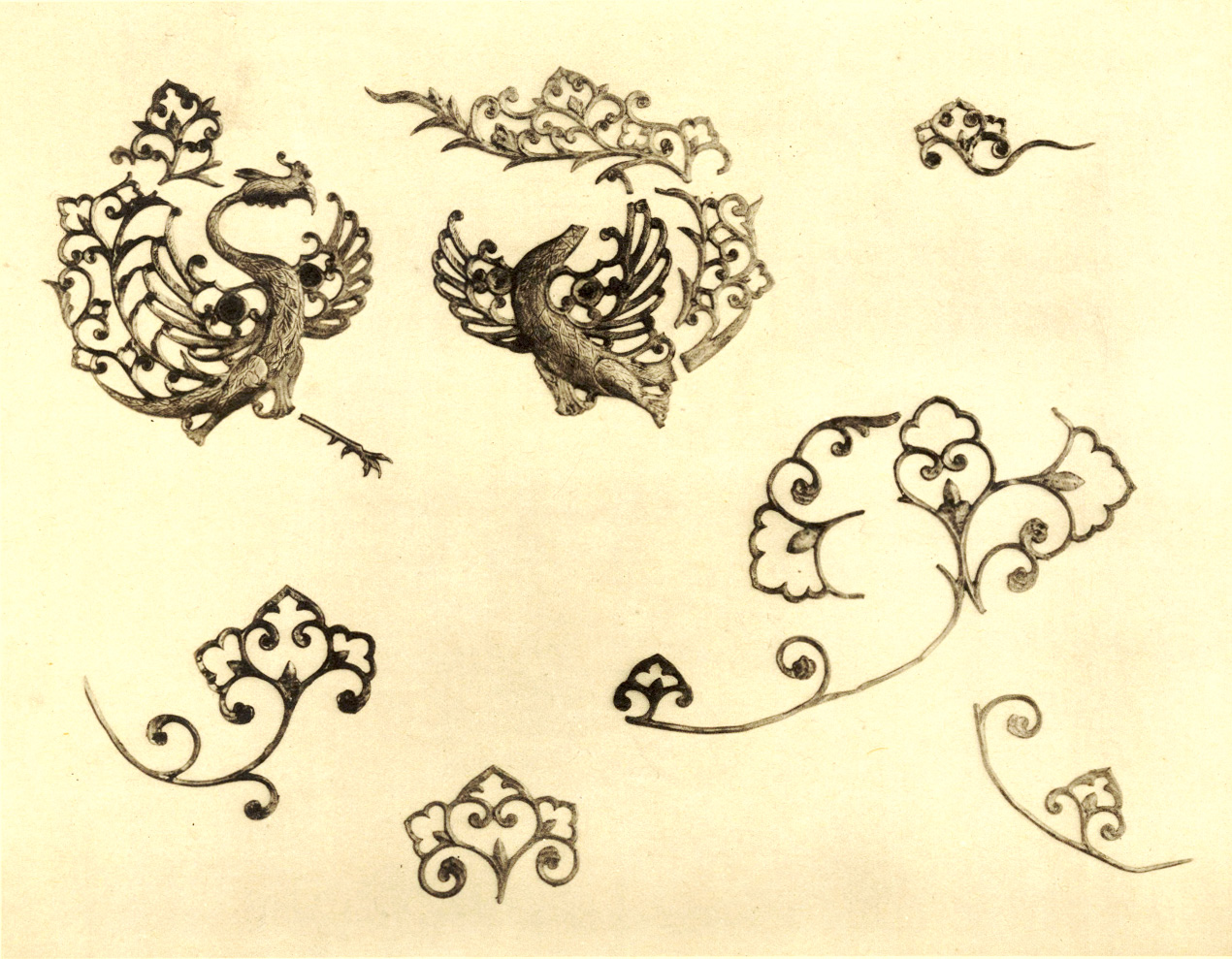
Phoenix and kazura-gata saimon parts from "Remnants of Ceremonial Dress and Crown," Shōsōin, 8th century.

The arabesque kuzura-gata Saimon (葛形裁文) design on the metal fittings decorating the pommel of the hilt and scabbard is the same pattern found on the Remnants of Dress and Crown (ja:礼服御冠残欠), the crown remnants of Emperor Shōmu and Empress Kōmyō in Shōsōin, and it was quite possible to produce such metal fittings using Japanese metal engraving techniques of the time. However, no Tang dynasty sword with similar metal fittings has been excavated. There are no surviving Tang dynasty swords other than those excavated from tombs, and there are very few excavated examples.

One known sword was excavated in 1992 from the tomb of Dòu Jiǎo (窦曒, d. 627) in Xi'an, but the shape of the pommel of the hilt is that of a ring-pommel sword, which is different from the Kara-tachi sword with gilded silver fittings and inlay.

The ring-pommel sword was also called Koma tsurugi (狛剣; lit. 'sword of Goguryeo') in ancient Japan, and it is believed that it was so called because it was initially introduced to Japan from Goguryeo. At that time, Goguryeo was called Koma in Japan. The swords described as "Koma style" (高麗様) in the Tōdai-ji Offering Book fall into this category. Therefore, "Tang" and "Koma" (Goguryeo) do not strictly refer to the place of production of the sword, but rather to the style of the sword's exterior.

== Bibliography ==
- Kurokawa, Mayori (1910). 黒川真頼全集 第３ 美術篇、工芸篇 [The Complete Works of Mayori Kurokawa Vol.3 Arts, Crafts]. Kokusho Kankō-kai Kankōsho (in Japanese). Kokusho Kankō-kai. doi:10.11501/991264.
- Mizoguchi, Teijiro (July 1912). "正倉院御物中の刀剣" [Swords in the Shōsōin Imperial Collection]. Journal of the Archaeological Society of Nippon (in Japanese). 2 (11). The Archaeological Society of Japan: 646–655. doi:10.11501/3548169.
- Rokkaku, Shisui (1932). 東洋漆工史 [History of Oriental Lacquer Work] (in Japanese). Yūzankaku. doi:10.11501/1870010.
- Shōsōin Office, ed. (1965). 正倉院の宝物 [Treasures of Shōsōin] (in Japanese). Asahi Shinbunsha. doi:10.11501/2505454.
- Murose, Kazumi (March 2011). "金銀鈿荘唐大刀の鞘上装飾技法について" [On the decorative technique on the scabbard of the Kara-tachi sword with gilded silver fittings and inlay]. Bulletin of Office of the Shosoin Treasure House (in Japanese) (33). Shōsōin Office, Imperial Household Agency: 1–16.
