= List of Tenjho Tenge characters =

The manga and anime series Tenjho Tenge features a large cast of characters, created by Oh! great.

== Juken Club ==
A collage of Tenjho Tenge's main characters, as they appear in the anime

The Juken Club (柔剣部, Jūkenbu) is a group created by Shin Natsume to unite the last members of the Katana Group and allow them to enter the Election Tournament. The initial formation was Shin Natsume, Mitsuomi Takayanagi, Bunshichi Tawara, Maya Natsume, and Kagesada Sugano. Two years after, led by Maya, the club became the main opposition to the Executive Council.

Souichiro Nagi (凪 宗一郎, Nagi Sōichirō)

- Voiced by: Sōichirō Hoshi (Japanese); Robert Brilliantes (Filipino) & Steve Staley (English)

A self proclaimed hoodlum, and the heir of the Demon Exorcist family. A first-year student, he has been fighting his whole life because of being picked on, due to his lineage. Because of the way he looked and acted, he had little experience with women his own age, until high school. He has problems expressing his feelings toward people, often acting detached to the people he cares most about. His family has long been discriminated against from the lack of understanding by others, and the fact that their power can cause them to become extremely powerful and dangerous to society.
Aya Natsume (棗 亜夜, Natsume Aya)

- Voiced by: Minori Chihara (Japanese); Charmaine Cordoviz (Filipino) & Stephanie Sheh (English)

A first-year student at the Toudou Academy and Maya's equally busty younger sister. Like her brother Shin, she possesses dragon eyes, which gives her the ability to see anywhere in the past, present, and possible futures. In addition, it allows her to see and listen to dead, and learn from inanimate objects. So far, she has difficulty controlling it. Since the first time they met, she has devoted herself to becoming Souichiro's wife, because she believes its fate and it follows the tradition of the Natsume women. A rift is formed between the sisters when Aya learns that Souichiro claimed Maya to be his first love and Maya off-handed comments caused a division in the sisters' relationship. Throughout the series, she has increased her skill and dedication so she can support Souichiro in any way.
Shin Natsume (棗 慎, Natsume Shin)

- Voiced by: Shūichi Ikeda (Japanese); Liam O'Brien (English)

Maya and Aya's older brother, who was the president of the Executive Council and founder of the Juken Club. He had the power of the dragon eyes like Aya, but was driven insane by them. His possession of the Reiki is blamed for his insanity. A lot of events in the series are based around Shin's actions and death.
Maya Natsume (棗 真夜, Natsume Maya)

- Voiced by: Aya Hisakawa (Japanese); Grace Cornel (Filipino) & Wendee Lee (English)

The curvy 17-year-old captain of the present Juken Club. A third-year student, she can control her body by shrinking herself to the appearance of an 8 year-old. She had a previous relationship with Mitsuomi, but has now sworn revenge on him for the events surrounding the death of her older brother, Shin. In later chapter, she inherit the Magatama Sorceress birth mark just like Senhime.
Dani Moure from Mania.com said "Maya makes an interesting leader of the Juken Club" and she also "has a pretty wicked sense of humour." Moure praised the character semblance, saying she is "full of charisma and attitude, and is sexy as well." Moure "love[d]" the fact of Maya stands in the small form to preserve her Chi and commented that "it gives another aspect to her character." Moure also noted the difference between her and her sister, Aya. Chris Beveridge also from Mania described Maya as "a curious character" because she like to be in the size of a four year old to avoid wearing the school uniform in favor of a traditional loose kimono. He found the revelation about the deal is with her size, "really amusing and an interesting twist". UGO Networks included Maya in their "Hot Girls We Wish Were Real" list at the twentieth place, as well as in the "Top Animated Hotties" list.
Shinichirō Kurei (暮井 新一郎, Kurei Shin'ichirō)
Vice-captain of the Juken Club. When people first meet this third-year student, most are shocked and often confuse him with an extraterrestrial because of the size and shape of his eyes, and the fact that he makes misleading sounds when sucking on his juice box. He is very intelligent, respectful, and is knowledgeable concerning technology.
Kagesada Sugano (菅野 影定, Sugano Kagesada)

- Voiced by: Takashi Kondō (Japanese); Richard Cansino (English)

An original member of the Juken Club, but was forced to join by Maya. A third-year student, he is better known by his nickname Asshat (or Scum in the anime) that was given to him by one of the teachers. During the Election Tournament, he remained hidden with Bunshichi and let Maya, Mitsuomi, and Shin do the fighting. He remained a member, although an inactive one, until Souichiro and Bob asked him to rejoin them in their cause. Though not as strong as other students in the school, he will use devious tactics in order to win. After Shin's death, he put himself through intense physical training to become stronger. Even though he is extremely perverted, he has several bodyguard girlfriends named The Sugano Bodyguard. He took the role of Advanced Guard for the Juken Club in the third round of the recent Election Tournament.
Masataka Takayanagi (高柳 雅孝, Takayanagi Masataka)

- Voiced by: Tomokazu Seki (Japanese); Bon Reyes (Filipino) & Johnny Yong Bosch as Kevin Hatcher (English)

A second-year, polite boy who trains under Maya. He falls in love with Aya at first sight, but is crushed when she goes for Souichiro. He's an excellent, but often overlooked, martial artist, and can enter into a berserker rage when pushed too far. He is currently estranged from his older brother, Mitsuomi, because of his association with Maya.
Bob Makihara (ボブ 牧原, Bobu Makihara)

- Voiced by: Shinichiro Miki (Japanese); Francis Ibanez (Filipino) & Jamieson Price (English)

Souichiro's childhood friend, who is of South African descent and has his hair styled in dreadlocks. He and Souichiro first met and became friends in elementary school. Naturally athletic, he fights using the Brazilian fighting style capoeira. Because of his ancestry, when he first arrived at Toudou, some addressed him as "The Foreigner". He is the conservative one of the pair, and unlike Souichiro, he does not let his rage overtake him.

== Executive Council ==
The Executive Council (執行部, Shikōbu) is the main force among the students of Toudou Academy, they keep the order on the school and punish the students that do not follow their rules. The Executive Council is chosen annually by the Election Tournament, where the winning group becomes the new Executive Council for the next school term. Two years ago, Mitsuomi became the leader of the group and his group won the next, keeping their post.

Mitsuomi Takayanagi (高柳 光臣, Takayanagi Mitsuomi)

- Voiced by: Toshiyuki Morikawa (Japanese); Kim Strauss (English)

The president of the Executive Council and Toudou Academy's top fighter. He is Masataka's brother and is seemingly displeased with his brother's choice of comrades, presumably because of the history between himself and Maya Natsume. He was at one time a friend of Maya's brother, Shin Natsume.
Emi Isuzu (五十鈴 絵美, Isuzu Emi)

- Voiced by: Haruhi Terada (Japanese); Kate Higgins (English)

A third-year student, as well as the vice-president of the Executive Council. Not only is she Mitsuomi's second-in-command, but she also harbors a deep respect and love for him. Because of Mitsuomi's lingering feelings for Maya, Emi sees Maya as someone she must defeat. At first sight, Emi appears to be a drop-dead gorgeous girl, but she is not called, "The Black Blade", for nothing. To the untrained eye, Emi seems to be able to pull out knives from nowhere. Her true secret is that she is obese, but has ability to fold in her fat, as well as being able to hide knives between her fat folds, thus confusing the enemy. Being a member of the rich Isuzu family, she works the family's traditional job as the Takayanagi family's inner guard.
Bunshichi Tawara (俵 文七, Tawara Bunshichi)

- Voiced by: Kazuki Yao (Japanese); Kirk Thornton (English)

A twenty-year-old senior of Toudou Academy and close friend of Shin and Mitsuomi. He is the advisor, essentially their strategist, of the Executive Council. He never does anything however, and insists he is a member in name only. Different from all the other characters, Bunshichi does not see any sense in training to be stronger than someone else and avoids entering into fights. Bunshichi is overwhelmingly powerful and is the strongest character in the series, despite his distaste for fighting.
Sakon Shima
Leader of the first division of the Executive Council. He appears very late in the series after the start of the tournament and suggests a night attack on the Juken Club when they split up for the night. He says the idea came from lower level members of the Executive Council's desire to crush the Juken Club. The plan is rejected by Bunshichi who suggests Sakon just quell the desire of the lower level members to attack the Juken Club before the finals.
Shirō Tagami (田上 士郎, Tagami Shirō)

- Voiced by: Eiji Hanawa (Japanese); Dave Mallow (English)

Third-year student and leader of the third division group of the Executive Council. He proclaims himself "the last samurai", following bushido. Being a gentleman, he despises cowardly ways of fighting. His style of fighting is using a hybrid bō that can turn into a sansetsukon. When fighting, he is very violent, but he does not take pleasure in hurting his enemies. As a samurai, he seeks for strong opponents and feels honored for fighting against them. He is currently ranked 9th of the Toudou Academy's strongest fighters and is the reserve of the Executive Council on the Election Tournament.
Shinobu Kagurazaka (神楽坂 忍, Kagurazaka Shinobu)

- Voiced by: Mitsuaki Madono (Japanese); Christopher Corey Smith (English)

Third-year student and the leader of Mitsuomi's guard, he does not seem to care very much about Mitsuomi's safety, which normally causes Emi to get upset at him. Kagurazaka have a very effeminate look and, for this, is called transvestite by Isuzu. Little of his abilities were shown, and he only had an unfinished fight against Masataka, but his stats on Kurei's data apparently puts him on the same level as Isuzu.
Kōji Sagara (相良 浩治, Sagara Kōji)

- Voiced by: Kenta Miyake (Japanese); Paul St. Peter (English)

Second-year student and the founder of the Pro Wrestling group, which became a subsidiary of the Executive Council. He joined the Executive Council only after Mitsuomi promised his startup group would not be destroyed, would get a place to practice, and have a budget. He has an alternate personality named Saga Mask, which according to him, is the most brutal enforcer of the school. When playing the part of Saga Mask, he will not take off his mask even if it will prevent trouble with others (including the police), because it is part of his beliefs. He was sent to punish Ryuuzaki for losing to Maya Natsume, and was used to prevent anyone escaping during the bowling alley attack. During this attack, he lost in a fight to Souichiro, but only going down after he was promised a rematch. After losing, he trains himself in the Japanese Alps for three months. Returning, he challenges Souichiro to a fight. Souichiro warns him that he might die, and then punches him so hard that entrails explode out of his back. It is revealed that it was just an illusion of Souichiro's murderous intent, but strong enough to show to Sagara the gap between their levels.
Tsutomu Ryuuzaki (竜崎 勤, Ryūzaki Tsutomu)

- Voiced by: Kenji Hamada (Japanese); Derek Stephen Prince (English)

Tsutomu is a second year student at Toudou Academy, and works as an Enforcer. He is very arrogant & frequently thinks he is stronger than he actually is. He is also very sadistic and perverted, seemingly having no moral code. To add to the list of less than desirable traits, Tsutomu is also very vindictive when crossed. Tsutomu is surprisingly good with some women. He has very good observational skills as he can identify people in masks just by looking at them. Tsutomu's Dragon's Gate is associated with fire. He seems to have the ability to create and manipulate fire, although he may only have the ability to manipulate it as Kōji Sagara refers to the ability as "sleight of hand tricks".
Mitsuiro Tokuan Shojo (猩 徳庵 蜜色, Shōjō Tokuan Mitsuiro)
While she is a member of the branch family, she is the current head of the Shojo family. She is Hirohiko's teammate whom she is in love with. However, due to tradition, she is unable to marry him. When she arrived at Toudou Academy it appeared as though she aligned herself with the Executive Council. It was hinted her real reason for coming was to finish her ancestor's work. Much like her ancestor before her, she seem to have the ability to copy people's appearance and physical attributes without their drawbacks, such as Mitsuomi's drawback of only able to fight effectively for three minutes.
Hirohiko Myouun Kabane (屍 妙雲 比呂彦, Kabane Myōun Hirohiko)
The current head of the Kabane family and Mitsuiro's teammate. He only recently arrived at Toudou Academy and he has appeared to have aligned himself with the Executive Council. It was hinted his real reason for coming was to finish his ancestor's work. He seems to be very informed about the strengths and weaknesses of others' powers. His power is the same as his ancestor's, he can materialize large blades seemingly out of nowhere.

== F ==
F is a group formed by the new leaders of the 12 Founding Families. The known members so far are: Ishiyumi, Tsumuji, Kabuto, Mawari, Kago and Kagiroi – it is known that a seventh member exists and is hinted to be Noriko Shindayuu Inue, but she may simply be a servant of Sōhaku Kago. There is also a possibility of other members that have not even been hinted at yet as we have yet to see a youth from the Hotaru or Wani families and the majority of the 36 branch families remain unknown. F is divided into the white feathers (those who have mastery over martial arts skills), and the red feathers (those who have magic and other supernatural abilities). Although Mitsuomi is the leader of the Takayanagi family, the members of F answer solely to Sōhaku.

Sōhaku Kago (寵 宗魄, Kago Sōhaku)
The first and only ever, head of the Kago family, the true leader of F, and the father of Souichiro Nagi. His power can infuse ki back into a lifeless body, reviving it from the dead. Through this means, Sōhaku seemingly "defies" death and has been alive for centuries. He also has the ability to store his consciousness in his right eye, allowing his soul to migrate to another body, when the eye is inserted into someone else's body. He has a habit of using people for his own means and getting rid of them when they are no longer useful to him. He has always been in conflict with the other founding families and is often responsible for many of their deaths. For some reason, he wants to awaken powers in people across the world using the Red Wing Resonance Effect.
Noriko Shindayū Inue (犬江 新太夫 典子, Inue Shindayū Noriko)
A woman with short black hair, who despite her young appearance she is in fact centuries old. She has been kept alive and young by Sōhaku Kago, and she is one of his most loyal followers. She is often entrusted with Sōhaku's experiments and seems to be highly protective of him, vengeful to anyone who harms him in even a minor fashion. She is a member of F, and the head adviser of the Akabane Clan in charge of obtaining bodies for Sōhaku. Noriko's power is that of the Dragon's Roar (龍砲), it uses her words to control others. Her ki is sent through the vibrations in the atmosphere, this allows her to make a link with another person's brain and grant her immediate control. Her power's weakness in that it can't control subconscious actions.
Tetsuhito Kagiroi (炬 鉄人, Kagiroi Tetsuhito)
The current head of the Kagiroi family and one of Sōhaku's most trusted subordinates. His mother was destroyed by Sōhaku when he was still in her womb, but he survived. The women in his family had a tradition of drinking iron sand, and did so without ill effects. This eventually led to the characteristic of their skin and blood being impervious to iron, and the creation of the iron fist attack. Because of Sōhaku's power to defy death, he has been living for centuries. When Sōhaku's experiment with Makiko Nagi was unsuccessful, Tetsuhito was transplanted with her eye. This allowed him to open multiple dragon gates and use multiple powers she had absorbed. It is revealed during his fight with Maya Natsume that his ki is visible when traveling throughout his body. This provided Maya with some indication what power he would use next. When he loses Makiko's eye that regulates his powers in his fight with Maya, his power goes out of control. He is eventually defeated and was killed by Maya when the Reiki's true form and power was activated.
Katsumi Kabuto (兜 克美, Kabuto Katsumi)
The current head of the Kabuto family. He acted as Sōhaku's assistant and supervised the operation to retrieve the computer chip at Enmi's shrine. When the operation failed, he agreed to fight with Souichiro to redeem himself, but since the fight was never shown, his power was never revealed. After his defeat he made a deal with Souichiro that if Souichiro freed him, he would help him escape Sōhaku's compound. He was last seen meeting Tessen, who seemingly killed him with multiple projectiles, but Kabuto later appears scarred but alive.
Jushi Mataza Tsumuji (颯 又左 需子, Tsumuji Mataza Jūshi)
The illegitimate son of Yorihira Mataza Tsumuji, the former leader of the Tsumuji family, and a member of the Shukyou family (a branch of the Kabane family, one of the red feather families of the Flying Phoenix). Because of his mother's being poor to the point of working as a prostitute and his red feather blood, Jushi was despised by his half-brother, the legitimate heir of the Tsumuji family, Yorimasa Mataza Tsumuji, who constantly assaulted and humiliated him. One day, an enraged Jushi tried to kill his brother, only being stopped by his father, who broke his spear. A large fragment of the spear penetrated into Mataza's right eye and was stuck into his brain. This activated the power of the Shukyou family, the Dragon Claw, that was instantly used to slice Yorimasa's right leg. Years later, Mataza grew to become the sadistic leader of the Tsumuji family, after a coup d'état on his father. He learned to hate his power and anything related to the red feathers, developing a style of combat based on eight mechanical arms and spears. He loved to torture his enemies, who he views as insects. During his fight against Souichiro, his mechanical arms were disabled and destroyed, so he decided to use his Dragon Claw. After devouring Jushi's power, Souichiro was tainted by his immense hatred, going berserk. Saved by his father from death, they both have apparently restored their relationship.
Tessen Ishiyumi (穹 撤仙, Ishiyumi Tessen)
The head of the Ishiyumi family, Tessen proved to be one of Mitsuomi's most loyal subordinates. Tessen normally keeps a level-head, and good humor about himself. However, his resolve to place Mitsuomi in power makes him a fearsome combatant. As he refers to Emi Isuzu and Shirō Tagami to Mitsuomi's Sword & Shield, Tessen analogizes himself to an arrow, who will stop at nothing until he pierces his prey. The nature of his chakra is that of the Second Dragon Gate – the Looping Orange Water Dragon. With this chakra activated, he can manipulate water sources into various forms; most commonly he uses water droplets as bullets. After their initial confrontation, Souichiro sealed Tessen's Dragon Gate, disabling his chakra. The revelation left such a lasting traumatic impact that he became a borderline-sociopath, with the one goal of retrieving what once was his. The extent of his madness drove him to vengeance, and even murder, on just about anyone who mocked his loss. Former F comrade, Katsumi Kabuto, paid the ultimate price for his folly with a barrage of hundreds of darts. But a turning point for Tessen came in his eventual meeting with Souichiro, which escalated into full-blown mortal combat. The intervention of Maya and Mitsuomi spared both from potentially killing one another. It was here that Mitsuomi restored Tessen to his former state of mind after learning how Sōhaku could open his Dragon Gate once again. Tessen's current condition and whereabouts are unknown as of this point.
Madoka Mawari (圓 円, Mawari Madoka)
She is the current head of the Mawari family and was a member of F; her specialty is fencing. She was under Sōhaku's jutsu that was maintained through an amulet on her necklace. This jutsu reduced the pain she felt in battle and also made her believe that she was in love with Sōhaku, even though he was the one who killed her parents. She was sent to retrieve the computer chip from the Juken club. She proved to be very determined until the jutsu was broken when Aya destroyed the amulet. Afterwards, she is proven to be a caring middle school student that is willing to help the Juken club in any way. During the time with the Juken club, she has taken a liking to Masataka, though he is painfully unaware of her affections.

== Supporting characters ==
Reiki (零毀, Reiki)
A ceremonial chokutō that was used to entrap all the power of the evil Buddhist ceremonies. Its powers are reliant on the person wielding it, thus, causing the user to go on a killing spree, or to a non-power user just be a long katana. While a power user holds it, it often activates their power and regulates it. When it is activated by a power user it uses large amounts of ki. Because of this, some power users lose control and are left fighting with their own powers. During this time they have been known to become increasingly cruel to the person they are fighting against. Later on it is revealed the sword has a spirit of its own that can manifest itself, with the help of Aya's Dragon Eyes. It claimed that once Aya knew everything, they will merge and together be the katana for the person who will break the chains of fate.
Dōgen Takayanagi (高柳 道現, Takayanagi Dōgen)

- Voiced by: Kinryuu Arimoto (Japanese); Steve Kramer (English)

Former head of the Takayanagi family and father of Mitsuomi and Masataka. During his time as the head of the Takayanagi family, he gathered power users from all over the world, so he could study the resonance effect. He also tried to make Mitsuomi into what he considered the "True Warrior", even if it meant turning a blind eye to Shin's ever increasing insanity. Two months after Shin and Mana's deaths, Mitsuomi overthrew him during the coup d'état as the leader of the family. He has since been living in an apartment with Masataka and working in the business sector. Although no longer as powerful as he was, he still maintains his obsession with the idea of the "True Warrior". He has teamed with Mitsuomi for the time being in an attempt to use Ichiyo Nagi's plan to destroy all the Red Feathers. Dōgen however sees it as a way to create his True Warrior, and plans to regain power by controlling this true warrior.
Makiko Nagi (凪 真貴子, Nagi Makiko)

- Voiced by: Yuri Amano (Japanese); Karen Strassman (English)

A demon exorcist and Souichiro's mother. In the past, she was a test subject for Sōhaku's experiment, who she claimed was her husband. During the experiment, she absorbed all the founding families' unique powers, except the Natsume's dragon eyes. Her body was deemed to weak for Sōhaku's true goal and in order for the experiment to not be a total loss for him, he had all the information of all the powers she absorbed moved into her eye. He then proceeded to remove her left eye in which he had it transplanted into Tetsuhito, giving him the powers. Sōhaku is also the one that took her left arm. Afterwards, she tried to raise Souichiro to be normal, all the while, she kept on doing her duties as an exorcist. When Souichiro was accepted into Toudou Academy, she weeps for what's to come, because more than likely, the resonance effect would awaken his powers. When Souichiro and Aya's powers started to awaken, she got some of the former family heads to train and coach them. She has also been watching over them with one of her powers, which is one of the reasons she knew Souichiro's dragon would go out of control during his fight with Mataza. She was able arrive in time to absorb his dragon spirit before it ripped him apart. However, this proved too much for her, causing her to lose her remaining arm. She was recovering from injuries with Yorihira in a remote hut in the mountains, but has since returned and is learning to use her robotic arms from Jushi.
Nokimi Mayutsubo (繭壺の君, Mayutsubo Nokimi)
She is a member of the Rikudou family, which is a branch of the Kago family. She also happens to be one of Sohaku confidants. She possesses the Koushin Dragon's Gate, which allows her to infuse parasite insects with her own ki. She then has the insects inserted into the host body. Afterwards she can control the host and make them exert immense amount of power until the insect's ki is exhausted and her insects die. She is known by the Executive Council and according to Jushi Mataza Tsumuji, her power is also important to Mitsuomi's plan. This plan involves a condensing the ki to bring forth "the true warrior".
Yorihira Mataza Tsumuji (颯 又左 頼平, Tsumuji Mataza Yorihira)
The former head of the Tsumuji family and father of Jushi. He was first seen with the rest of the surviving former heads of families, when they were training Souichiro. Later, Souichiro and Aya run into him at the Enmi shrine, where he was looking for the computer chip. Once Aya helps him locate the chip, he took off because he did not want to get them involved. He maintains personal guilt for the way his son has turned out and believes that he alone should be the one to stop him. He blames himself so much that he even goes a far as trying to stabbing his own eyes (lost his left eye) as a way to atone for the sins his son has committed to the Enmi family. When Makiko was recovering, he was taking care of her in a remote hut in the mountains, but has returned to check out the activities of the Election Tournament.
Fu Chi'en (虎 瀉殷, Fū Chein; Pinyin: Hǔ Xièyīn)

- Voiced by: Issei Miyazaki (Japanese); Ezra Weisz (English)

An earth-elemental user who was brought over from Taiwan by the Takayanagi family to oversee Mitsuomi's training. He was also secretly part of the Chinese mafia that was working for Sōhaku. Since he only came to Japan for money, he had a habit of not always following his orders. He did follow Dōgen's order to trigger Shin's dragon eyes, by kidnapping, beating and physically humiliating Maya. He fought with the enraged Shin and lost both of his hands. While in the hospital, he received his prosthetics, which contained blades. He vowed to get revenge with Shin, starting by going after Maya. When leaving his hospital room, he was met by Shin, who quickly killed him. Through Sōhaku's power, his life is returned to his mangled body, and is sent to retrieve computer chip from the Juken Club. Driven by his madness and desire for revenge, combined with Sōhaku's jutsu, he proved to be a destructive force. He was defeated by Masataka, with the help of Bunshichi, before his power destroyed him. Before apparently being killed by Tetsuhito, he thanks Masataka, claiming he never felt happier. Despite his apparent destruction, he appears guarding one of Sōhaku's mystical constructs in Taiwan; by this point, having lost his lower body in the fight with Tetsuhito, his torso is horizontally attached to a conveyance resembling a penny-farthing.
Mana Kuzunoha (葛葉 真魚, Kuzunoha Mana)

- Voiced by: Shiho Kawaragi (Japanese); Melissa Fahn (English)

She was Shin Natsume's girlfriend. During the storyline, it was revealed that she was assigned to be his girlfriend, in order for her to be in a better position to observe and collect data about him for the Takayanagi family. She helped Shin create the Katana group, to get even more data and make it less boring for Shin. Over time she began to truly love him, even though he did not love her as much as he did Maya. Being part of the medical group, she has saved countless lives from Shin's insanity, some through her acupuncture technique. She takes an interest in Mitsuomi Takayanagi because she believe he is the only one capable of stopping Shin. She also starts sleeping with Mitsuomi, in order to distance his interest in Maya, who, to Shin, is more like a lover than a sibling. In the end, she is fatally wounded by Shin's forged needle attack while he was under the power of the dragon eyes. When Shin realize what he had done, she helps him commit suicide.
Chiaki Kounoike (鴻ノ池 千秋, Kōnoike Chiaki)

- Voiced by: Ryoko Shiraishi (Japanese); Julie Ann Taylor (English)

Bob's girlfriend with a very open mind and is sexually active with him. She is raped-(beaten physically in the anime series) by Ryuuzaki after he decides to give Souichiro and Bob an "Unlimited Punishment. Although she never stood against Souichiro and Bob' street-fighting, she opposes them after their joining with the Juken Club. After hearing the story about Maya and Mitsuomi's relationship, she starts to think that Maya's ego is what drives everyone around her to be miserable. When Bunshichi explains the whole story, Chiaki decides to give support to the Juken Club, still believing that Maya's stubbornness is what caused the past events to occur. She and Bob enjoy having sex together, even to the point where she wanted Bob to drop out of school so they could have sexual intercourse everyday; despite being Bob's lover, she attends a different school-(as well as wearing a different school uniform) than the other characters.

== Minor characters ==
Shizuru Kamura (禿羅 志鶴, Kamura Shizuru)
The second daughter of the Kumura family. She was caught on purpose, in order to get close enough to Sōhaku, to avenge her older brother. Her power from the green belt dragon gives her incredibly powerful leg attacks and phenomenal jumping power. She was defeated by Noriko, who was controlling Souichiro's body. Afterwards, she was forced by Noriko to repeatedly hit herself in the head for causing very minor injury to Sōhaku, and was left by Noriko for Souichiro to use however he wanted. Together, they planned to escape the compound, but were rescued by Mitsuomi, Maya, and Madoka. She was last seen holding off Sōhaku's advancing forces with Tessen while the others went ahead. Judging from her reactions to Maya, she seems to have developed feelings for Souichiro.
Mrs. Hotaru
She is a doctor and former head of the Hotaru family. She was first seen with the rest of the surviving former 12 Founding Family heads, when they were training Souichiro. She claims that if anyone dies under her care then it was destined because her Dragon Palm can heal anything except stupidity and athletes foot. She is a chain smoker to the point that she smokes two cigarette at the same time and seems go through withdrawal when she stops.
Mouki Enmi (厭魅 魍鬼, Enmi Mōki)
A young boy who is the current heir of the Enmi family. When F attacked his family's shrine, he was forced to hide under the floorboards, while his family was slaughtered. Afterwards, he made his way into the Natsume residence for protection, because his family was once their branch family. Souichiro and Aya volunteered to help him save his guardian Enma, who was captured. With some guidance from Souichiro, he overcame his fears and became a warrior that his family always wanted. His powers are that of illusions created with help of his family's moths.
Enma Enmi (厭魅 厭摩, Enmi Enma)
The head priestess of the Enmi shrine and Mouki's guardian. During F's attack on the shrine, she was able hide and protect Mouki. However, she was captured and held prisoner, during which, she was repeatedly sexually tortured by Mataza and later raped and sexually violated by his troops, who were left to guard her during his absence. Her anguish was eventually ended when she was rescued by Mouki. Her powers are same as the rest of the family's power of illusion, which is accomplished through their moths.
Raika Rotsukaku (六角雷花, Rotsukaku Raika)
She is a freshman on the tournament Steering Committee. She acts as a referee of the Juken Club matches, in which she records the match conditions and situations to be sent to the Steering Committee headquarters. However, she does not have the authority to stop a match. She missed the first round because she decided to walk while sitting in a chair instead of walking normally. She seems to have interest in the Juken members and often takes pictures of them since she is also an avid photographer.
Unnamed Taxi Driver
An unlucky taxi driver, whose he claims his wife often cheats on him. He is often shown picking up or forced to pick up other characters in the series, which for the most part, have left him with bad experiences (usually in the form of his car getting surrounded by imposing underlings under the individual who also happens to be his passenger's enemy at the time).

== Feudal Japan ==
During the Tenshō period (sec. XVI), on the middle of a civil war, the Rising Phoenix was created, assuring the Takayanagi family would have the support of the 12 founding families. Below the leader of the Takayanagi, the head of the Kago family, Sōhaku, emerged as the leader of the 12 families only answering to the Takayanagi orders.

=== Major characters ===
Ichiyō Nagi (凪 一葉, Nagi Ichiyō)
Was the head of the Nagi family and leader of the assassination group assigned to kill Sōhaku. Even though he was very young, he was well liked and respected by the other heads of the founding families. As a leader, he was wise beyond his years and never made any rash decisions. Most of the time, he remained composed, but he did show tears for Aya and Midori's deaths. He miscalculated how difficult killing Sōhaku was and was forced with the other founding families to agree to a truce. The remainder of his days were spent defying Sōhaku by hunting down those with special powers, in order to stop the Resonance Effect. This goal led to the creation of a highly detailed plan to wipe out all the Red Feathers; this plan wasn't carried out for centuries as some of the required elements have just now come together.
Aya Natsume (棗 愛文, Natsume Aya)
Maya and Aya's ancestor from 14 generations ago and one of the Reiki's previous owners. She was part of the assassination group assigned to kill Sōhaku. Even though she looked like an adult with her powers, her actual age was only nine years old. She had the power to create illusions and make a realistic, fully controllable copy of herself as an adult, with the help of her beetles. She is depicted as having quite the mean streak, especially when it concerned her teammate Ichiyō. Some of her unkind behavior was misleading, as it was later exposed that she actually was treating the frostbitten feet of a peasant girl with Samurai hat and not just hurting her. She managed to kill Sōhaku's body while his powers were nullified by Senhime, like Ichiyō planned, but was also killed by him with her own dagger. Before dying, she mistook Aya's presence for Ichiyō and said she was happy for helping him at least once in her life and that she would be going ahead of him.

Even though her name and the present Aya's name having an equal pronunciation, they are written with different kanji.

Tokuan Shōjō (猩 徳案, Shōjō Tokuan)
Was the head of the Shōjō family and part of the assassination group assigned to kill Sōhaku. His power gives him the ability to copy someone else's appearance and change others as well. His power also allows him to read their ki, so he could copy their physical techniques. After the death of his friend and teammate, he begins to wear Myouun's skull necklace as a remembrance. After the raid, he takes the appearance of an older Sōhaku, who is believed to be dead. The presumption is proved to be false, because two years later, Noriko took out one of his eyes and replaced it with Sōhaku's. Since Sōhaku's consciousness was stored in that eye, Tokuan's body was taken over. Sohaku taking over Tokuan's body cut off the Shojo bloodline, indicating Tokuan likely had no siblings or children. Tokuan is, therefore, the last true Shojo family member. A Shojo branch family took on the name, and inter-married relatives to bring their power closer to the original Shojo family's power.
Myouun Kabane (屍 妙雲, Kabane Myōun)
Was the head of the Kabane family and part of the assassination group assigned to kill Sōhaku. He was a Buddhist priest who alluded that he died 10 years ago, when he was the cause of a great atrocity. He had the power to materialize multiple blades and launch them at his opponents, as well as a keen sense of smell. An avid drinker of fine sake, he ignored Ichiyō's order to stay inside. While on the streets, he was ambushed and killed, because his powers were neutralized by the Magatama Shrine Maiden.
Senhime (千姫, Senhime)
Ieyasu's granddaughter and the Magatama Shrine Maiden that is only born once every one thousand years. As the Magatama Shrine Maiden, she is marked with a special birthmark over her breast and controls the amaterasu's dragon gate. Unlike all other dragon gates that rotate clockwise, the amaterasu's dragon gate rotates counterclockwise, thus neutralizing others' powers. This power, however, needed a great barrier to be controllable. She had been a virtual prisoner inside Osaka Castle and had never gone outside. Sōhaku built a barrier that allowed him to reverse her power from neutralization into amplification, to increase the resonance effect, when the red feathers attacked him. She was very fond of Sōhaku, partly because he would often revive her dead dog Yumemaru. After Sōhaku's supposed death, she stayed in the castle until she was rescued by some of Tokuan's elite soldiers. Even then she did not want to leave and was willing to burn with the castle, the only thing she knew. Her wishes were not respected and she was taken away. She was sent to live under the supervision of one of her grandfather's closest confidants, as Ichiyō had suggested.

Character loosely based on the historical figure Senhime

=== Supporting characters ===
Ieyasu Tokugawa (徳川 家康, Tokugawa Ieyasu)
A nobleman and also Senhime's grandfather. He was famous for being modest, reserved, honest and conscientious, but he fell under Sōhaku's jutsu, where he became mad, locking himself in his room, doing horrendous acts to young women. This jutsu was finally lifted when Sōhaku was stabbed by Aya. Later on, he was shown as one of military leaders laying siege on Osaka Castle. When the war ended, he was shown living happily with Tokuan, as his company, until he was attacked and killed by Tetsuhito.

Character loosely based on the historical figure Tokugawa Ieyasu

Yoshikatsu Shinjirō Yagyuu (柳生 新次郎 厳勝, Yagyū Shinjirō Yoshikatsu)
He was the castellan of the Osaka Castle. Working under the name Shume Sano, he was a master swordsman. He was responsible for killing Myouun and the defeat of Aya's bug clone. He also proved to be a match for Tokuan, and was only defeated after Tokuan had imprinted Yoshitaku's techniques on himself. After he pled for his life, Toukan decided to change his appearance and tells him to live his life as Tadaaki Jiroemon Ono.

Character loosely based on the historical figure Yagyū Yoshikatsu (father of Yagyū Hyōgonosuke)

Masanobu Sadonokami Honda (本多 佐渡守正 信, Honda Sadonokami Masanobu)
He was Ieyasu's confidant. He betrayed Sōhaku when he helped Aya sneak amongst Senhime's female attendants. The reason behind his betrayal is that he read Ichiyō's letter and learned that Ieyasu would become the next Emperor if Sōhaku was killed. A few years later, his testicles are crushed by Noriko, as revenge for his treachery and he was most likely killed.

Character loosely based on the historical figure Honda Masanobu

=== Minor characters ===
Yukimura Sanada (真田 幸村, Sanada Yukimura)
The military commander responsible for defending Osaka Castle against Ieyasu's attacking forces. According to his own men, he was the sole reason the castle held for so long. During the last days of the battle, he broke through an army of 140,000 with 300 Cavalry and was going to take Ieyasu's head, but was prevented by Ichiyō. He has a similar appearance to Bunshichi, but it is currently unknown if he is Bunshichi's ancestor.

Character loosely based on the historical figure Sanada Yukimura

Tadaaki Jiroemon Ono (小野 次郎右衛門 忠明, Ono Jiroemon Tadaaki)
He was singing swordsman who was on his way to Osaka castle to be recommended by his master to Ieyasu. He was ambushed by Myouun and Tokuan in a brothel, during which, he was killed and his identity was taken by Tokuan.
Loosely based on the historical figure, Mikogami Tenzen
Crab girl
A peasant girl that was catching crabs with her mother at the same time as Sōhaku's assassination group. She wore a samurai hat that she found after her father was killed by the soldiers from Osaka Castle. While catching crabs, Aya rubbed a powder on her feet which everybody thought was a cruel practical joke, but later learned that Aya actually cured the frostbite on her feet. A few years later, she was shown being chased by bandits who had already killed her mother. She was saved by Ichiyō, but since she lost her parents, she thought she would be better off dead. When she regained her composure, she accepted Ichiyō offer for her to travel with him.
Midori (翠, Midori)
A friendly prostitute that worked in the same brothel as Aya. She often looked out for Youko, Ichiyō's undercover name, who she thought was Aya's little sister. She witnessed Tadaaki's murder and Tokuan taking his appearance. When discovered, she was tortured by Aya's illusions and killed by a distressed Ichiyō. Although she is a very minor character, she seems to have had profound impact on Ichiyō to the point that he thinks about her years after her death.
