= Chokutō =

Straight, single-edged Japanese sword

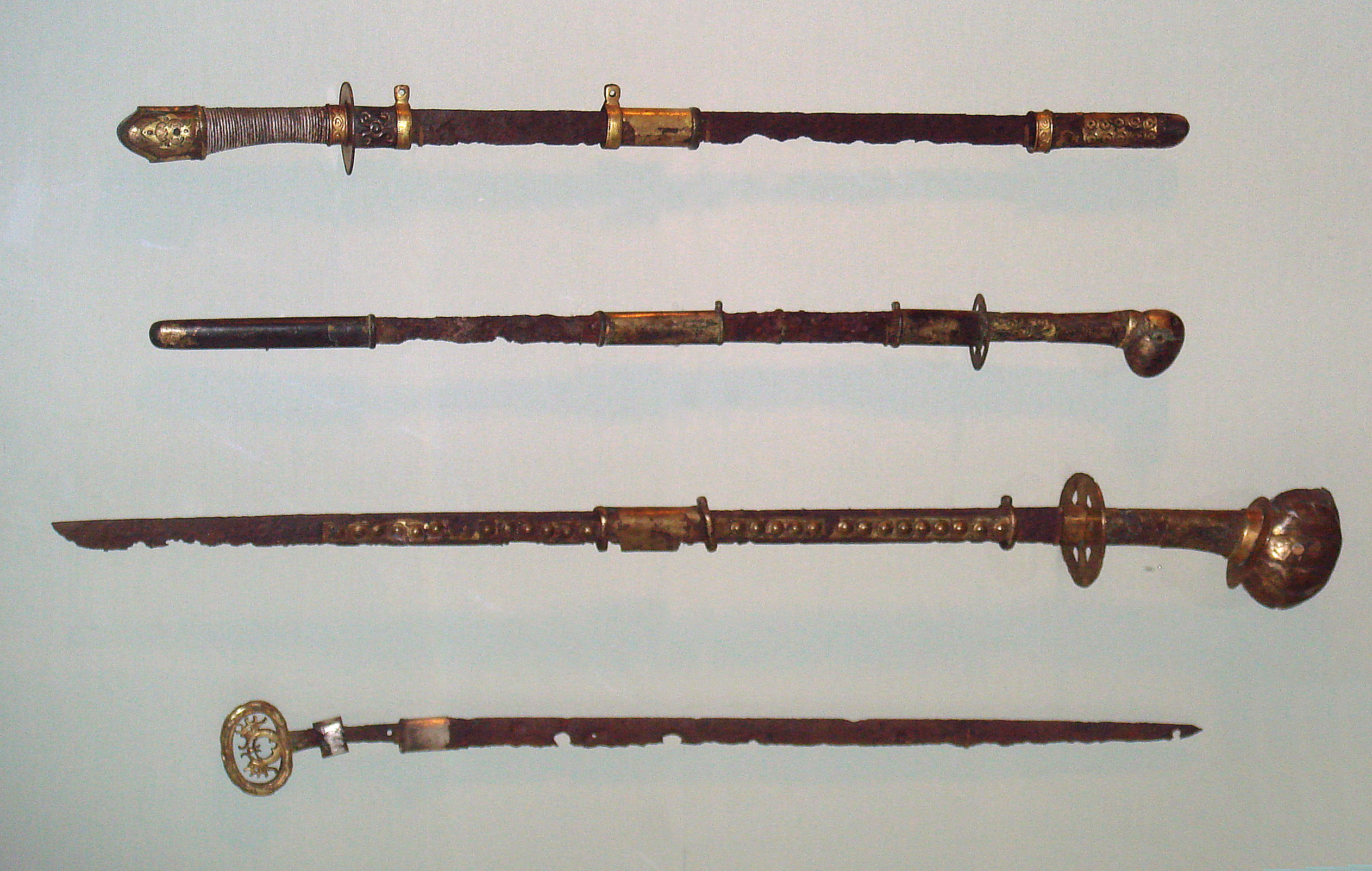
Japanese straight swords, 6–7th century, Kofun period, Met Museum

The chokutō (直刀, 'straight sword') is a straight, single-edged Japanese sword that was mainly produced prior to the 9th century. Its basic style is likely derived from similar swords of ancient China. Chokutō were used on foot for stabbing or slashing and were worn hung from the waist. Until the Heian period such swords were called tachi (大刀), distinct from tachi written as 太刀, as the latter refers to curved swords.

== History ==
The production of swords in Japan is divided into specific time periods:

- Jōkotō (ancient swords, until around 900 CE)
- Kotō (old swords from around 900–1596)
- Shintō (new swords 1596–1780)
- Shinshintō (new new swords 1781–1876)
- Gendaitō (modern or contemporary swords 1876–present)

The tsurugi was the earliest type of sword made in Japan. The chokutō, on the other hand, was among the earliest types of sword to be forged in Japan, its basic style and forging techniques probably originated in ancient China and Korea. The chokutō was brought to Japan by way of Korean Peninsula and China in the Han dynasty times.

There are various types of chokutō in the Kofun period (300－538), and there are styles originated in China and styles unique to Japan. The kantō-tachi (環頭大刀) is a Chinese style, characterized by a ring-shaped ornament shaped like a dragon or a phoenix on the tip of the handle. The Kabutsuchi-tachi (頭椎大刀) is a unique Japanese style with a fist-like decoration on the tip of the handle. The rokkaku-sōtōken (鹿角装刀剣) is also unique to Japan and is decorated with deer antlers. As the name suggests, this style is also applied to tsurugi.

The chokutō in various styles including these styles declined around the end of the Asuka period (593－710), and only the style called the hōtō-tachi (方頭大刀), in which the decoration on the tip of the handle was rectangular parallelepiped, survived from the Nara period (710－794).

Chokutō typically come in hira-zukuri and kiriha-zukuri tsukurikomi (blade styles) which make them very distinct from later tachi and katana which rarely use these forms. Swords of this period are classified as jōkotō and are often referred to in distinction from Japanese swords.

Chokutō as a weapon died out by the middle of the Heian period, in the 10th century. And as a weapon, it was completely replaced by the Japanese sword, which is known today for its deep and graceful curves. The first sword with this curve was called Kenukigata-tachi (ja:毛抜形太刀), which was made by improving Warabitetō (ja:蕨手刀) used by Emishi in Tohoku region. And Kenukigata-tachi evolved into tachi, which became the mainstream of Japanese swords for a long time.

== Sugari no Ontachi ==
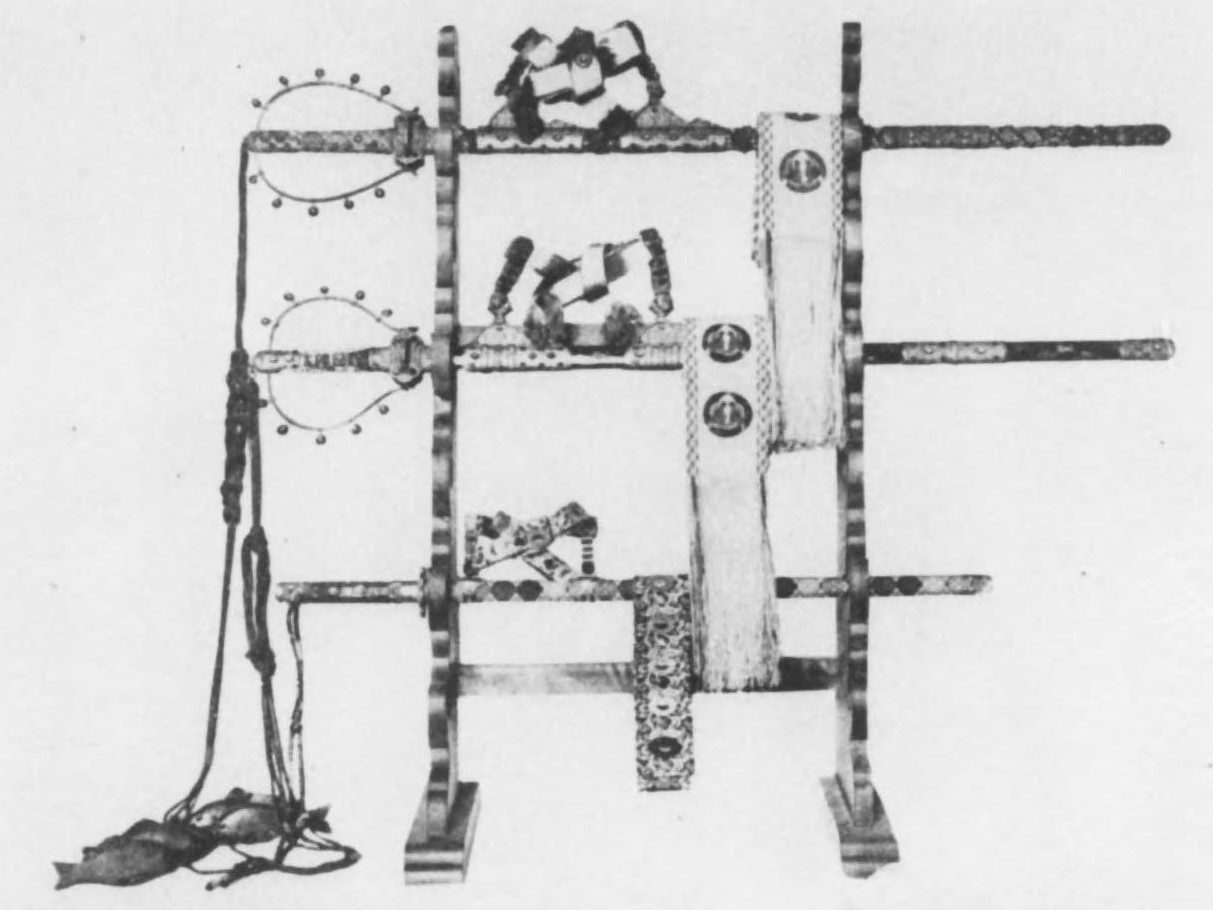
Tamamaki no Ontachi (玉纏御太刀; top), Sugari no Ontachi (須賀利御太刀; middle), and Kondō zukuri no Ontachi (金銅造御太刀; bottom), newly made for the Shikinen Sengu (式年遷宮, rebuilding the shrine) of 1889

In today's Japan, straight swords made with the techniques after chokutō, are also called chokutō, and these are sometimes used in traditional ceremonies. The Sugari no Ontachi (須賀利御太刀) is one of the chokutō made as an offering to Amaterasu, the main enshrined kami of Ise Grand Shrine, and one of the most gorgeous sword mountings among the chokutō. According to tradition, the building of Ise Grand Shrine and its sacred treasures have been recreated to the same specifications every 20 years since the seventh century. The Sugari no Ontachi was first described in the Kotai Jingu Gishikicho (皇太神宮儀式帳) compiled in 804, and it is believed that new decorations were added to the scabbard and sword fittings at each subsequent Shikinen Sengu (Rebuild every 20 years, 式年遷宮) to complete the design as we know it today. The Sugari no Ontachi currently offered to Ise Grand Shrine was remade in 2013 and is thought to have accurately inherited the style of sword mountings from the Heian period (794－1185) and the forging method from the Sinto period (1596－1781).

== Gallery ==
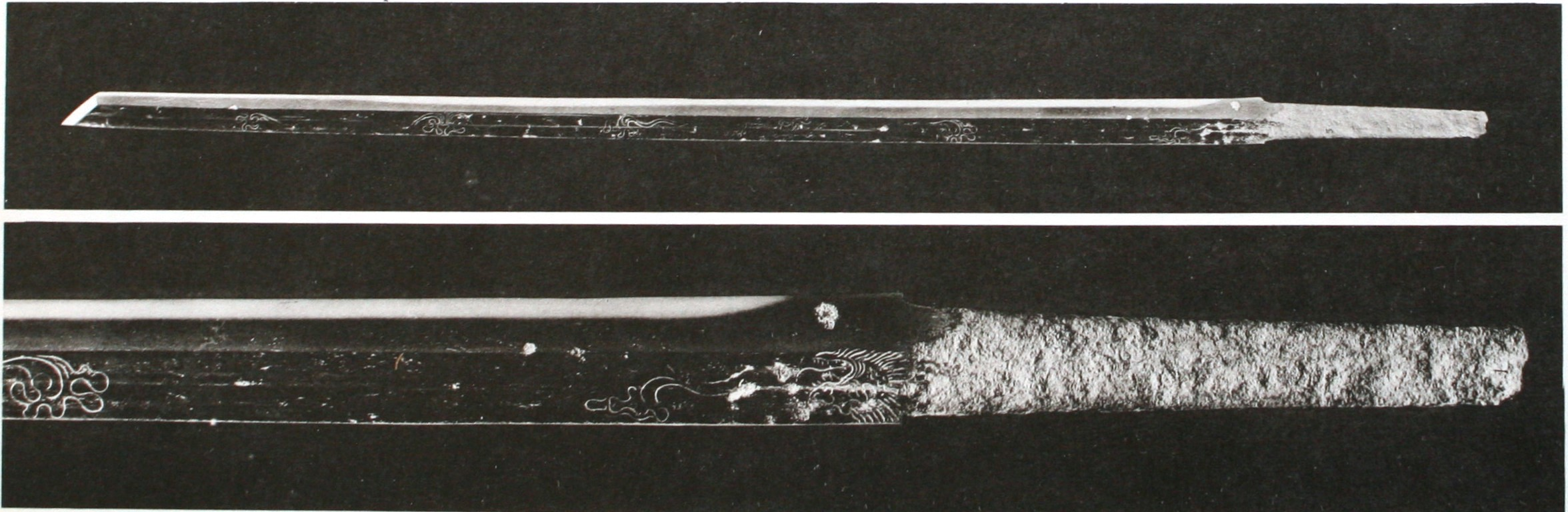
Shitennō-ji Shichiseiken, single-edged straight sword, Asuka period

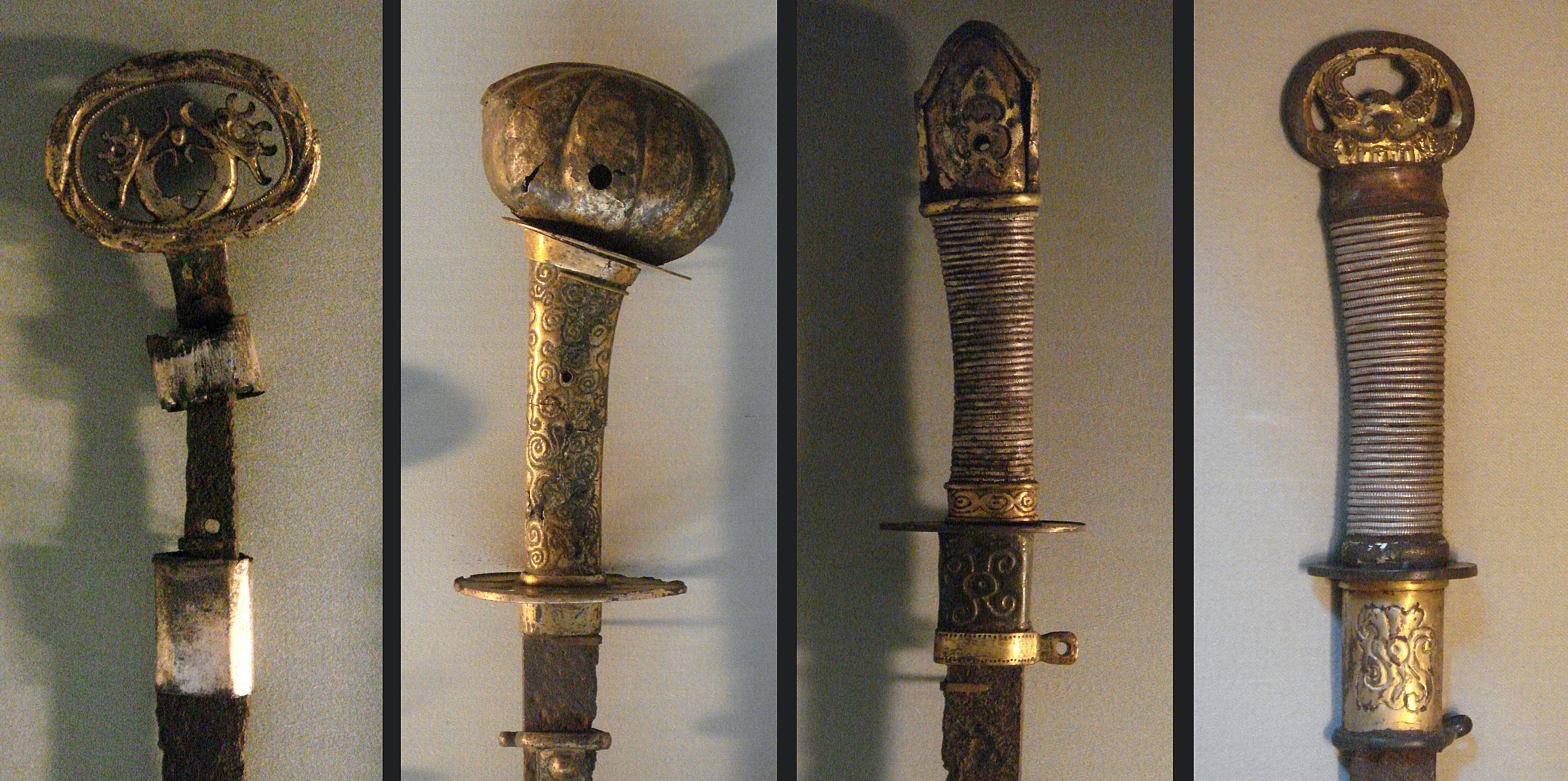
Hilts of Japanese straight swords, Kofun period, 6–7th century, Met Museum.

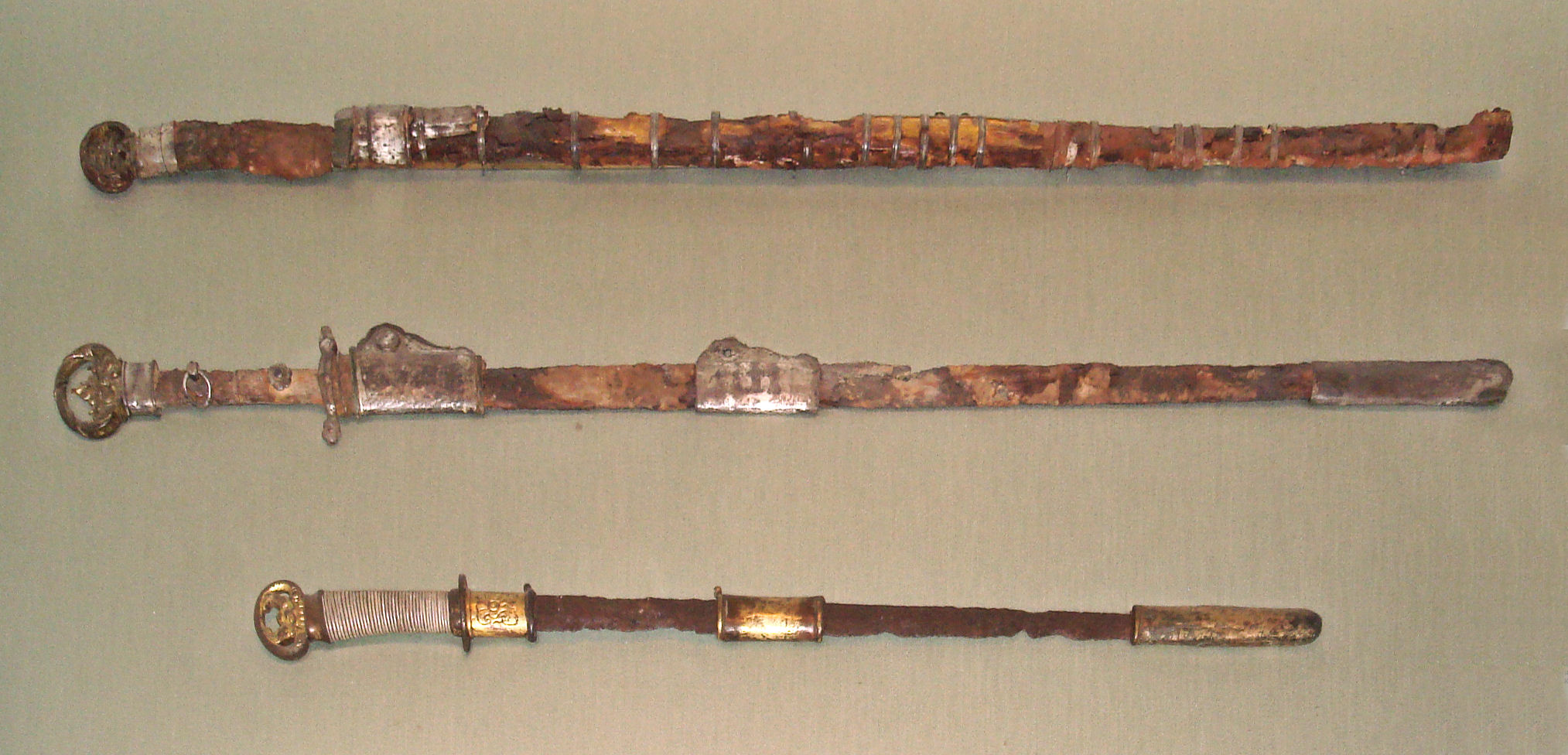
Two Chinese swords (top) of the Sui dynasty. Bottom: Japanese sword with scabbard, Kofun period, 6th century, Met Museum.

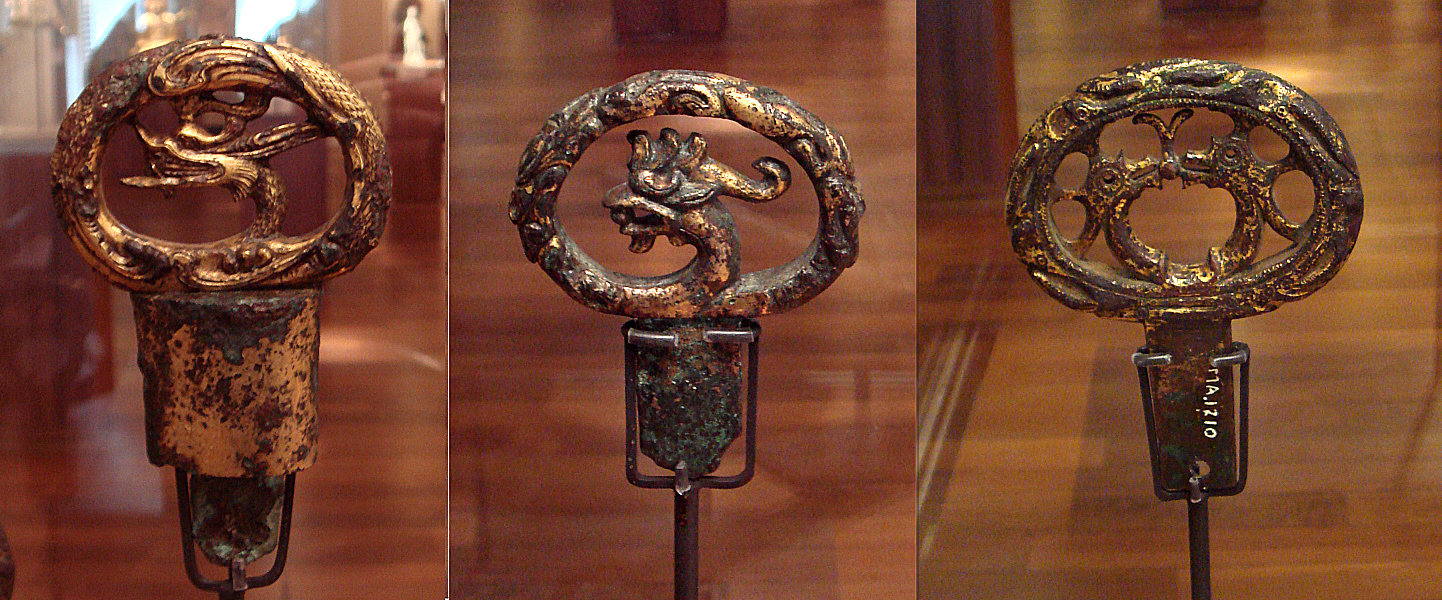
Sword hilts, end of the Kofun period, Japan, 6th century. Musée Guimet.

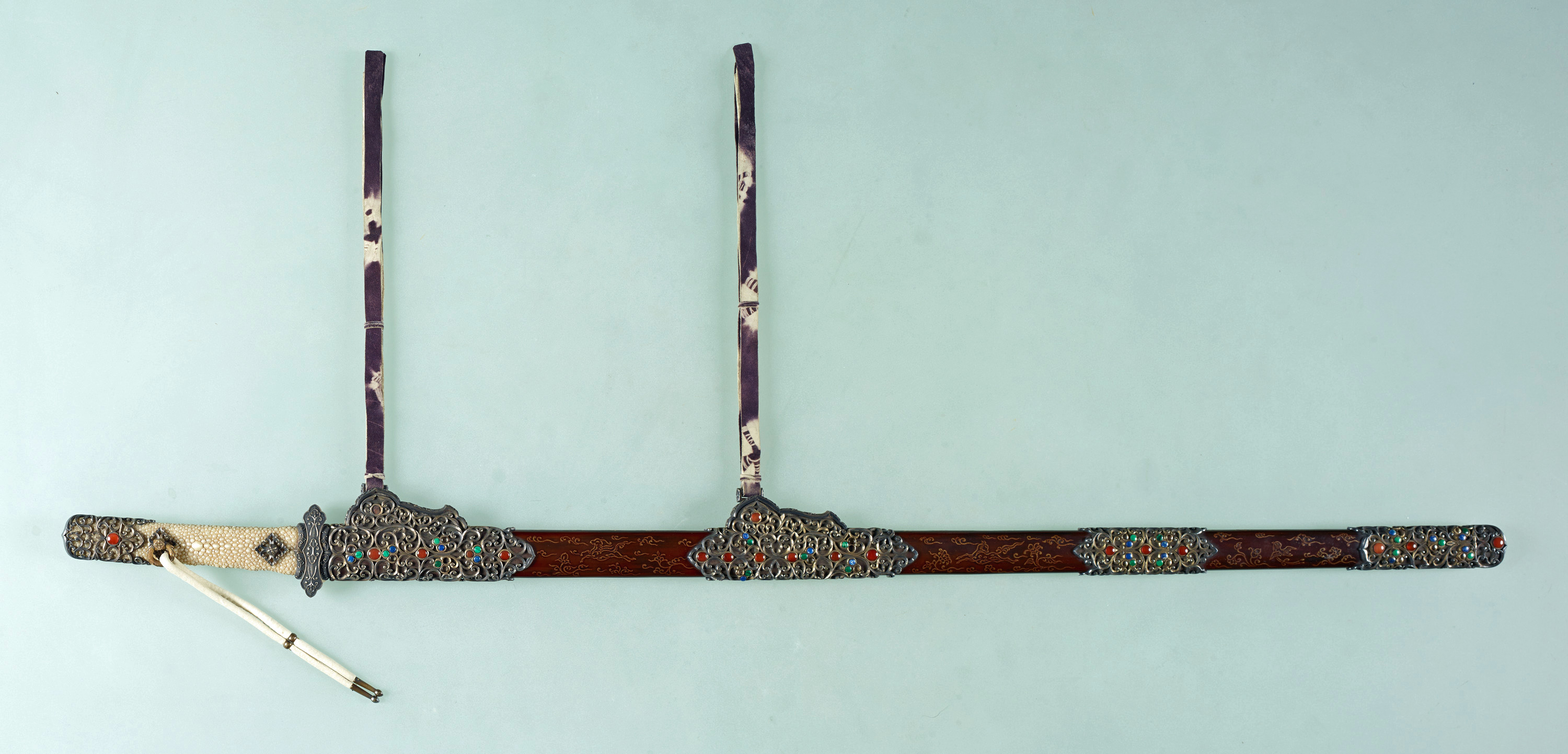
Kara-tachi sword with gilded silver fittings and inlay, imitation made in the 19th century, by Sōkichi Tamura.

== See also ==
- Japanese sword
- Tsurugi (sword)
