= Metallurg Anosov =

Metallurg Anosov may refer to:

- Anosov Pavel Petrovich, tsarist Russian governor-general and metallurgist-scientist
  - Statue of Metallurgist Anosov, Zlatoust, monumental Statue of Anosov Pavel Petrovich in Zlatoust, Russia
  - SS Metallurg Anosov, Soviet general cargo ship, which was a missile carrier also
