= Wootz steel =

Type of crucible steel

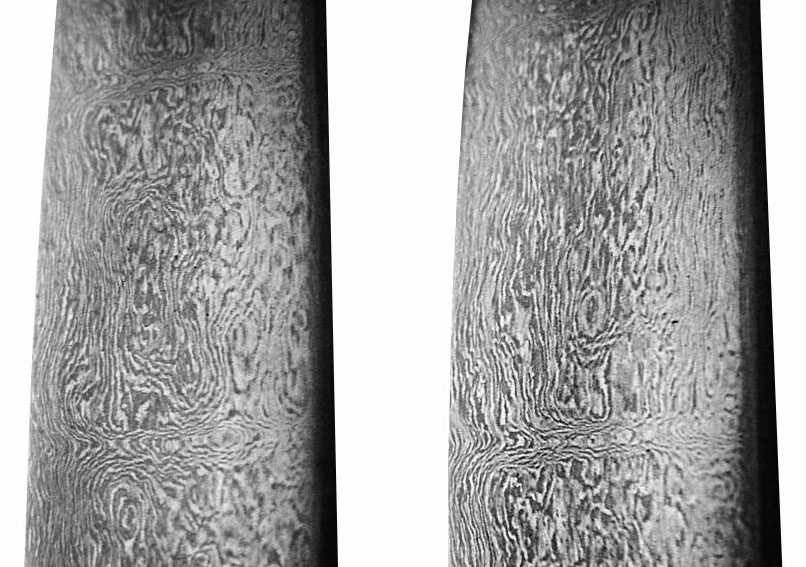
Crucible steels like wootz steel and Damascus steel exhibit unique banding patterns because of the intermixed ferrite and cementite alloys in the steel.

Wootz steel is a crucible steel characterized by a pattern of bands and high carbon content. These bands are formed by sheets of microscopic carbides within a tempered martensite or pearlite matrix in higher-carbon steel, or by ferrite and pearlite banding in lower-carbon steels. It was a pioneering steel alloy developed in southern India in the mid-1st millennium BC and exported globally.

== History ==
Wootz steel originated in the mid-1st millennium BC in India. It was made in Golconda in Telangana, Karnataka, Tamilnadu and Sri Lanka. Wootz steel was produced in ancient Tamil Nadu. Excavations at Kodumanal, located near Karur, the capital of the Cheras, have revealed an iron- and steel-working centre with furnaces and crucibles used in steel production. Kodumanal lay on a trade route connecting Karur with the west coast through the Palakkad Pass. The production process involved reducing iron ore and carburizing iron in crucibles at high temperatures, producing high-carbon wootz steel. The steel produced in southern India was also traded westward and became associated with the later production of Damascus steel. The steel was exported as cakes of steely iron that came to be known as "wootz". The method was to heat black magnetite ore in the presence of carbon in a sealed clay crucible inside a charcoal furnace to completely remove slag. An alternative was to smelt the ore first to give wrought iron, then heat and hammer it to remove slag. The carbon source was bamboo and leaves from plants such as Avārai. Locals in Sri Lanka adopted the production methods of creating wootz steel from the Cheras by the 5th century BC. In Sri Lanka, this early steel-making method employed a unique wind furnace, driven by the monsoon winds. Production sites from antiquity have emerged, in places such as Anuradhapura, Tissamaharama and Samanalawewa, as well as imported artifacts of ancient iron and steel from Kodumanal. Recent archaeological excavations (2018) of the Yodhawewa site (in Mannar District) discovered the lower half of a spherical furnace, crucible fragments, and lid fragments related to the crucible steel production through the carburization process. In the South East of Sri Lanka, there were some of the oldest iron and steel artifacts and production processes to the island from the classical period.

Trade between India and Sri Lanka through the Arabian Sea introduced wootz steel to Arabia. The term muhannad مهند or hendeyy هندي in pre-Islamic and early Islamic Arabic refers to sword blades made from Indian steel, which were highly prized, and are attested in Arabic poetry. Further trade spread the technology to the city of Damascus, where an industry developed for making weapons of this steel. This led to the development of Damascus steel. The 12th century Arab traveler Edrisi mentioned the "Hinduwani" or Indian steel as the best in the world. Arab accounts also point to the fame of 'Teling' steel, which can be taken to refer to the region of Telangana, the Golconda region of Telangana clearly being the nodal center for the export of wootz steel to West Asia.

Another sign of its reputation is seen in a Persian phrase – to give an "Indian answer", meaning "a cut with an Indian sword". Wootz steel was widely exported and traded throughout ancient Europe and the Arab world, and became particularly famous in the Middle East.

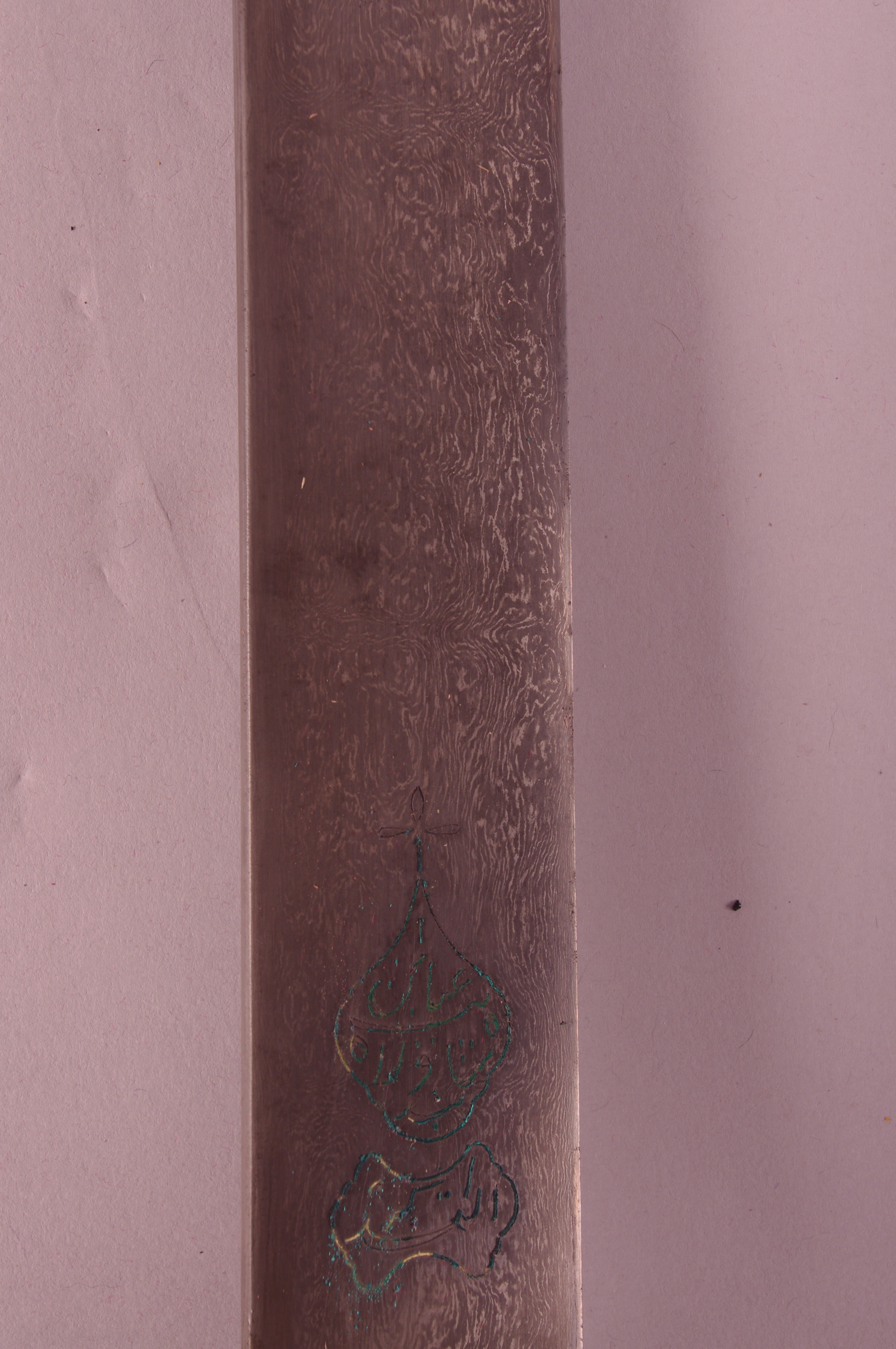
Detail of 17th–18th C. Indian tulwar/shamshir

=== Development of modern metallurgy ===
From the 17th century onwards, several European travelers observed the steel manufacturing in South India, at Mysore, Malabar and Golconda. The word wootz was derived from the Tamil word urukku based on the meaning "melt, dissolve". Other Dravidian languages have similar-sounding words for steel: ukku in Kannada and Telugu, and urukku in Malayalam. When Benjamin Heyne inspected the Indian steel in Ceded Districts and other Kannada-speaking areas, he was informed that the steel was ucha kabbina ("superior iron"), also known as ukku tundu in Mysore.

Legends of wootz steel and Damascus swords aroused the curiosity of the European scientific community from the 17th to the 19th century. The use of high-carbon alloys was little known in Europe previously and thus the research into wootz steel played an important role in the development of modern English, French and Russian metallurgy.

In 1790, samples of wootz steel were received by Sir Joseph Banks, president of the British Royal Society, sent by Helenus Scott. These samples were subjected to scientific examination and analysis by several experts.

Specimens of daggers and other weapons were sent by the Rajas of India to the Great Exhibition in London in 1851 and 1862 International Exhibition. Though the arms of the swords were beautifully decorated and jeweled, they were most highly prized for the quality of their steel. The swords of the Sikhs were said to bear bending and crumpling, and yet be fine and sharp.

== Characteristics ==
Wootz is characterized by a pattern caused by bands of clustered Fe_{3}C particles made by melting of low levels of carbide-forming elements. Wootz contains greater carbonaceous matter than common qualities of cast steel.

The distinct patterns of wootz steel that can be made through forging are wave, ladder, and rose patterns with finely spaced bands. However, with hammering, dyeing, and etching further customized patterns were made.

The presence of cementite nanowires and carbon nanotubes has been identified by Peter Pepler of TU Dresden in the microstructure of wootz steel. There is a possibility of an abundance of ultrahard metallic carbides in the steel matrix precipitating out in bands. Wootz swords were renowned for their sharpness and toughness.

=== Composition ===
T. H. Henry analyzed and recorded the composition of wootz steel samples provided by the Royal School of Mines. Recording:

- Combined carbon 1.34%
- Uncombined carbon 0.31%
- Sulfur 0.17%
- Silicon 0.04%
- Arsenic 0.03%

Wootz steel was analyzed by Michael Faraday and recorded to contain 0.01-0.07% aluminium. Faraday, Messrs (et al.), and Stodart hypothesized that aluminium was needed in the steel and was important in forming the excellent properties of wootz steel. However T. H. Henry deduced that presence of aluminium in the wootz used by these studies was due to slag, forming as silicates. Percy later reiterated that the quality of wootz steel does not depend on the presence of aluminium.

== Reproduction research ==
In the 19th century, wootz steel was studied in depth by the Royal School of Mines in an attempt to reproduce it. Dr. Pearson was the first to chemically examine wootz in 1795 and he published his contributions to the Philosophical Transactions of the Royal Society.

Russian metallurgist Pavel Petrovich Anosov (see Bulat steel) was able to reproduce ancient wootz steel with nearly all of its properties, and the steel he created was very similar to traditional wootz. He documented four different methods of producing wootz steel that exhibited traditional patterns. His work titled “On Bulat Steels” was published in the Mining Journal (ru:Горный журнал).

In the late 20th century, J.D Verhoeven and Alfred Pendray chemically analysed extant Damascus blades, reconstructed methods of production, proved the role of impurities of ore, specifically the inclusion of vanadium (~0.005%) in carbide formation, along with the need for repeated thermal cycling of the forged blades in the pattern creation, to reproduce wootz steel blades with patterns microscopically and visually identical to ancient blade patterns.

Reibold et al.'s analyses spoke of the presence of carbon nanotubes enclosing nanowires of cementite, with the trace elements/impurities of vanadium, molybdenum, chromium etc. contributing to their creation, in cycles of heating/cooling/forging. This resulted in a hard, high-carbon steel that remained malleable.

There are smiths who are now consistently producing wootz steel blades visually identical to the old patterns. Steel manufactured in Kutch (in present-day India) particularly enjoyed a widespread reputation, similar to those manufactured at Glasgow and Sheffield.

With fellow experts, the Georgian-Dutch master armourer Gocha Laghidze developed a new method to reintroduce "Georgian Damascus steel". In 2010, he and his colleagues gave a masterclass on this at the Royal Academy of Fine Arts in Antwerp.

== See also ==
- Toledo steel
- Noric steel
- Bulat steel
- Tamahagane steel
- Ferrous metallurgy
- Iron pillar of Delhi
- Pattern welding
