= Statue of Metallurgist Anosov, Zlatoust =

Statue in Zlatoust, Russia

Statue of Metallurgist Anosov
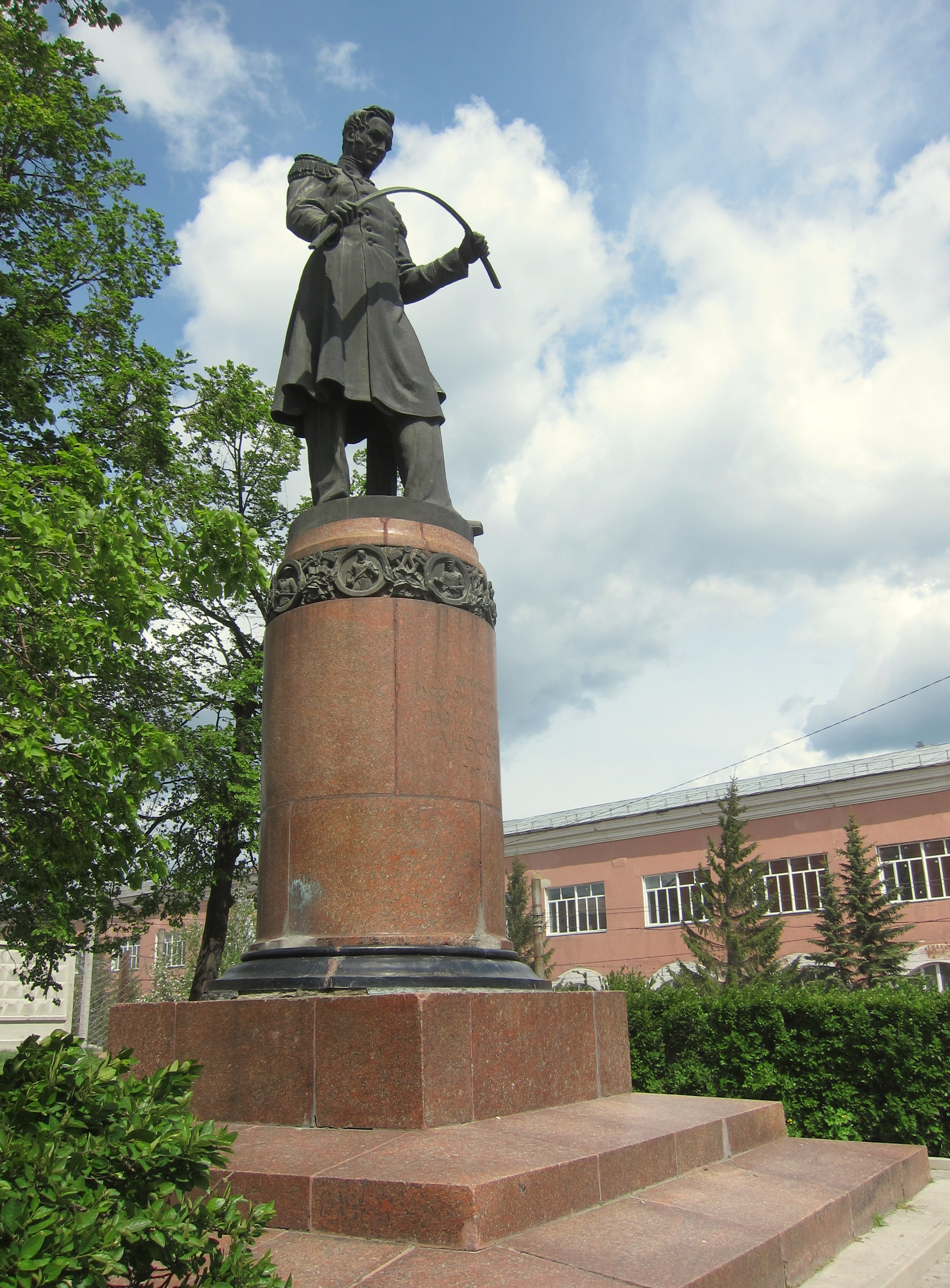
- Statue of Metallurgist Anosov on the Third International Square in Zlatoust, Urals Military District, was erected on 15 December 1954. By Moscow sculptors A.P. Antropov and N.L. Strain and architect T.L. Shulgina.
- Artists: A.P. Antropov, N.L. Shtamm, and T.L. Shulgina
- Year: 1954
- Medium: Bronze
- Subject: Anosov Pavel Petrovich
- Dimensions: 9.5 m (31 ft)
- Location: Zlatoust, Chelyabinsk Oblast

The Statue of Metallurgist Anosov in Zlatoust city is situated on the main square of the historical center of Zlatoust, Chelyabinsk Oblast in Russia.The statue was erected in honor of Russian General-Major, metallurgist and governor of the Ural District, Anosov Pavel Petrovich, and unveiled on 19 December 1954. It was created by Moscow sculptors A.P. Antropov, N.L. Shtamm, and architect T.L. Shulgina.

== Description ==
The bronze statue is mounted on a massive pedestal of red Ukrainian granite, and is 9.5 m (31 ft) high, the statue itself being 4.6 m (15 ft).

Anosov Pavel Petrovich is depicted standing in the uniform of a general-major of the Mining Corps, with a curved strip of Damascus steel held between his hands. A microscope is placed on the post on the left of the statue, on the same tall pedestal. The pedestal is a cylindrical shape, which rests on a square plinth. The inscription on the pedestal reads: "Great Russian metallurgist Pavel Petrovich Anosov 1797-1855"; his correct year of birth, 1799, was later installed on the pedestal in 1999.

His date of birth was long a subject of controversy among researchers. Only two centuries later was the exact date established according to documentary evidence - 29 June 1796, leading to the involuntary error on the inscription.

The Statue of the Metallurgist is a "twin" to the Statue of Yuriy Dolgorukiy in Moscow which was erected in 1954.

== History of creation ==
The construction of the monument began with the decision of the Council of Ministers of the Soviet Union to commemorate Anosov Pavel Petrovich. On 15 November 1948, the Chairman of Council of Ministers of the Soviet Union Joseph Vissarionovich Stalin signed the Decree № 4229: "About the perpetuation of the memory of the great Russian metallurgist Pavel Petrovich Anosov". The first paragraph of the decreed refers to the construction of the monument of Anosov in Zlatoust. The dream of P.P. Anosov, grandson of N.A. Yanovskiy, which had been voiced half century ago, became a reality.

From the beginning to end, the process of creating a new monument was coordinated by the deputy mayor of the city, D.Z. Istomin, along with many organizations and experts who were also involved. The metallurgists of the Southern Ural organized a conference in Zlatoust in September 1949, in which the employees of metallurgical enterprises, research and educational institutions, representatives of Moscow, Leningrad, Sverdlovsk and other industrial centers of the country took part. The conference was devoted to the 150th anniversary of Anosov's birthday, and the reports mostly described his achievements and creative heritage. On the second day, 11 September, the participants at the conference attended the city meeting on the occasion of discussion of the future monument "bookmark". A concrete marker- an obelisk with the inscription: "Here will be constructed a Statue of the Great Russian Metallurgist P.P. Anosov," was installed on the same place where the present Statue was later erected. One week later, the "bookmark" was included in the list of the city historical monuments.

On 25 May 1951, to mark the 100th anniversary of P.P. Anosov's death, a memorial plaque was posted on the facade of the city history museum, the house in which Anosov lived for many years. It is one of three plaques affixed to the building.

The sculpture's bronze castings were made by the "Монумент-скульптура" plant (English: Monument-sculpture) in Leningrad. The granite pedestal was made in Mytishchi.

According to the Resolution № 1327 of the Council of Ministers of RSFSR dated 30 August 1960, the Statue of Metallurgist Anosov was taken under protection as a monument of national importance and republican values.

== Bulat steel ==
Mikhail Fonotov wrote in his book Native Olden Times (Russian: Родная старина):

A knife blade? Yes, there was the bulat blade.

And then there was the tank's armored steel.
And then there was the rocket steel.
And then there was a nuclear shield.

Anosov. Korolyov. Kurchatov."

When the Russian people say Anosov, they think of bulat steel.

Bulat steel weapons are legendary; the novelist Sir Walter Scott described competitions in agility between King Richard the Lionheart and the Sultan Saladin with damask steel blades. Arabs were said to use blades which were flexible enough to wrap around the waist and yet hard and sharp so that a falling silk scarf could be cut by an unmoving damask blade.

Bulat is one of the most interesting mysteries of metallurgical history; there are still many methods of bulat and damask blade production in Arabia and India that are unknown, and have been lost.

Some scientists argue that Anosov rediscovered the secret of the production of bulat steel. Anosov's bulat steel was able to reproduce the flexibility, but the hardness was lacking. In the 20th century, Soviet scientists achieved the appropriate hardness of the steel, but its flexibility did not equal that achieved by Anosov's methods.

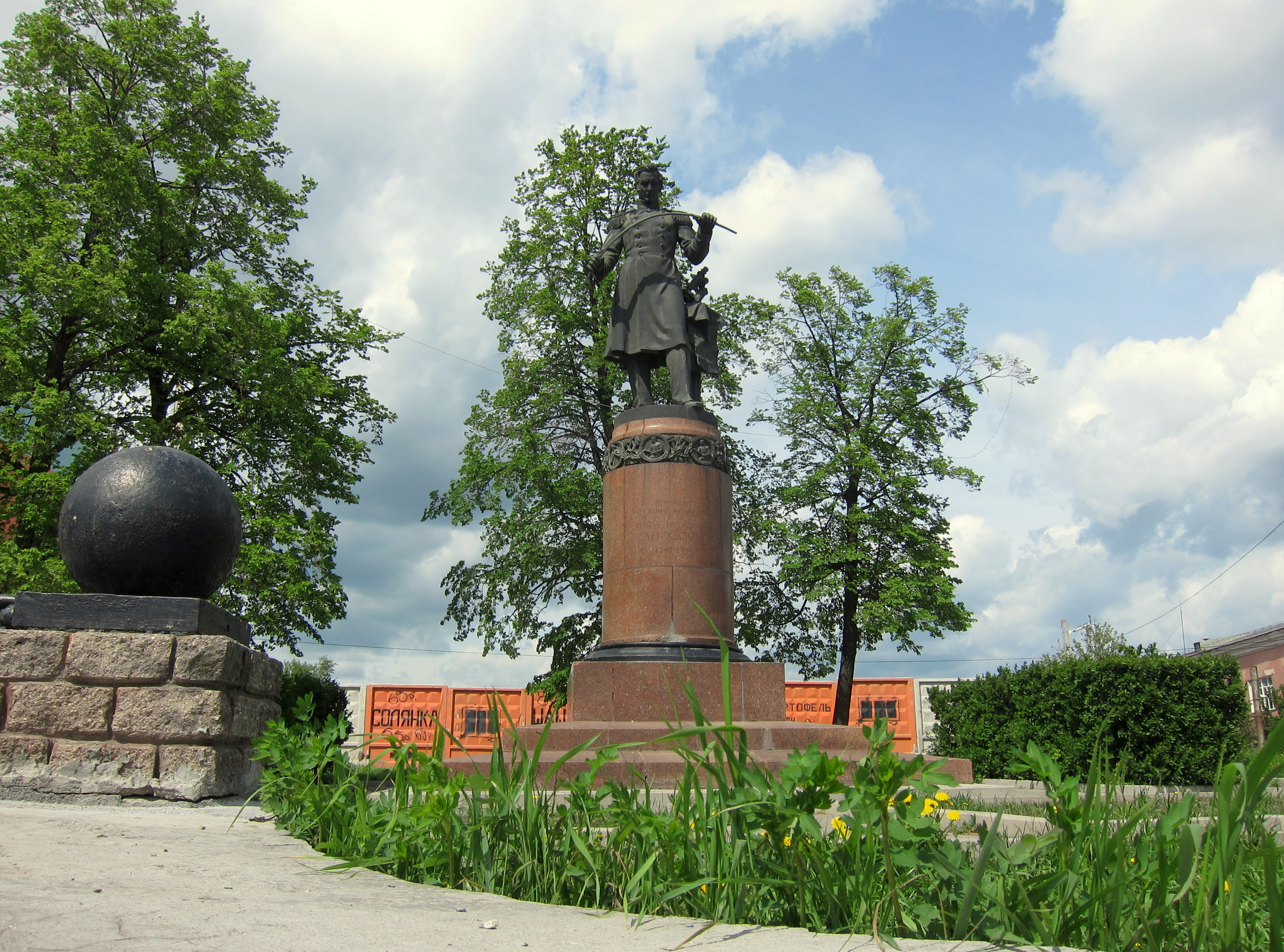
Statue of Metallurgist Anosov on the Third International Square in Zlatoust.

== Postscript ==
In 1960, the Statue of P.P. Anosov was taken under protection as a monument of national importance and republican values and today it is a monument of Federation values.

In March 1998, for the first time, the bronze Anosov was removed from its pedestal in order to be restored. The newly refurbished statue reappeared in September of the same year.

The Soviet-era Statue of Metallurgist Anosov is one of the most common scenes on postcards with views of Zlatoust.

== See also ==
- Statue of Graf Vorontsov, Odesa
- Statue of Yuriy Dolgorukiy, Moscow
