= Crucible steel =

Type of steel

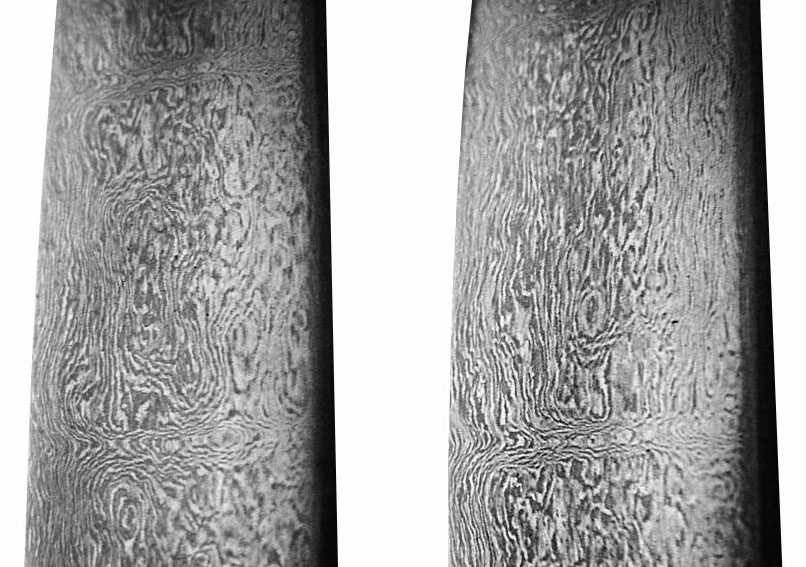
"Kirk nardeban" pattern of a sword blade made of crucible steel, Zand period: 1750–1794, Iran. (Moshtagh Khorasani, 2006, 506)

Crucible steel is steel made by melting pig iron, cast iron, iron, and sometimes steel, often along with sand, glass, ashes, and other fluxes, in a crucible. Crucible steel was first developed in the middle of the 1st millennium BCE in Southern India and Sri Lanka using the wootz process.

In pre-industrial times, it was not possible to produce sufficient temperatures with charcoal or coal fires required to melt iron or steel. However, pig iron, having a higher net alloy content and thus a lower melting point, could be melted. This is due to the effect of freezing-point depression. By co-heating wrought iron or steel with pig-iron for a long time, Carbon content in the pig iron could be reduced as it slowly diffused into the iron. In addition, H2O containing organic materials could be mixed into fluxing agents. Oxygen reacted with excess phosphorus, sulfur, and silicon typical of pig iron producing additional heat and low density slag. The additional heat was sufficient to dissolve some or all of Wrought Iron scraps turning the previous raw materials into a medium-carbon steel ingot. This also allowed slag and oxide inclusions in the W.I. to float on the surface, producing superior internal cleanliness. Crucible steel of this type was produced in South and Central Asia during the medieval era.

This generally produced a very hard steel, but also an ingot that might be inhomogeneous, consisting of a very high-carbon steel regions (formerly the pig-iron) and lower-carbon steel regions (formerly the wrought iron).

The crucible steel process might result in an intricate pattern when the steel was filed, polished, then etched. Possibly the most well-known examples coming from the wootz steel used in Damascus swords. Such steel was typically higher in average carbon content (typically ranging in the area of 1.5 to 2.0%) and relatively high in phosphorus, which contributed to the distinctive water pattern. This effect was caused by slowly cooling the cruicibles over several days.

The preceding factors caused an excessively coarse, dendritic crystal grain structure in crucible steel ingots, and alloy segregation at the edges of the grains as they grew. The increased alloy content at the as-cooled grain boundaries caused the steel to be attacked more slowly by etchants, resulting in a frost-like or woodgrain-like pattern after polishing and etching. However the majority of crucible steel ingots did not exhibit this effect. This led items showing the effect to be ascribed mystical properties. Although it was merely a result of excessively coarse grain size and a particular alloy composition.

The steel was usually subjected to a grain refinement heat treatment, then forged at relatively low temperatures to avoid hot-shortness, crumbling, or excess diffusion of carbon.

With a carbon content close to that of cast iron, it usually required minimal heat treatment after finishing other than air cooling amd tempering to achieve the correct hardness, relying on composition alone.

In Europe, crucible steel was developed in parallel during the 1740s, by Benjamin Huntsman, of Sheffield, England. Huntsman used coke, rather than charcoal, achieving temperatures high enough to melt steel and dissolve iron, in combination with a glass shard flux to reduce impurities. Huntsman's process differed from some of the Wootz processes in that it used iron and steel as raw materials, in the form of blister steel, rather than direct conversion from cast iron as in puddling or the later Bessemer process, a glass flux to reduce impurities, and the higher temperatures and carbon content of coke, along with a longer time to melt the steel and to cool it down, to thus allowed more time for the diffusion of carbon.

The ability to fully melt the steel removed any inhomogeneities in the steel, allowing the carbon to dissolve evenly into the liquid steel and negating the prior need for extensive blacksmithing in an attempt to achieve the same result. Similarly, it allowed steel to be cast by pouring into molds. The use of fluxes allowed nearly complete extraction of impurities from the liquid, which could then simply float to the top for removal. This produced the first steel of modern quality, providing a means of efficiently changing excess wrought iron into useful steel. Huntsman's process greatly increased the European output of quality steel suitable for use in items like knives, tools, and machinery, helping to pave the way for the Industrial Revolution.

== Methods of production ==
Iron alloys are most broadly divided by their carbon content: cast iron has 2–4% carbon impurities; wrought iron oxidizes away most of its carbon, to less than 0.1%. The much more valuable steel has a delicately intermediate carbon fraction, and its material properties range according to the carbon percentage: high carbon steel is stronger but more brittle than low carbon steel. Crucible steel sequesters the raw input materials from the heat source, allowing precise control of carburization (raising) or decarburization (lowering carbon content). Fluxes, such as limestone, could be added to the crucible to remove or promote sulfur, silicon, and other impurities, further altering its material qualities.

Various methods were used to produce crucible steel. According to Islamic texts such as al-Tarsusi and Abu Rayhan Biruni, three methods are described for indirect production of steel. The medieval Islamic historian Abu Rayhan Biruni (c. 973–1050) provides the earliest reference of the production of Damascus steel. The first, and the most common, traditional method is solid state carburization of wrought iron. This is a diffusion process in which wrought iron is packed in crucibles or a hearth with charcoal, then heated to promote diffusion of carbon into the iron to produce steel. Carburization is the basis for the wootz process of steel. The second method is the decarburization of cast iron by removing carbon from the cast iron. The third method uses wrought iron and cast iron. In this process, wrought iron and cast iron may be heated together in a crucible to produce steel by fusion. In regard to this method Abu Rayhan Biruni states: "this was the method used in Hearth". It is proposed that the Indian method refers to Wootz carburization method; i.e., the Mysore or Tamil processes.

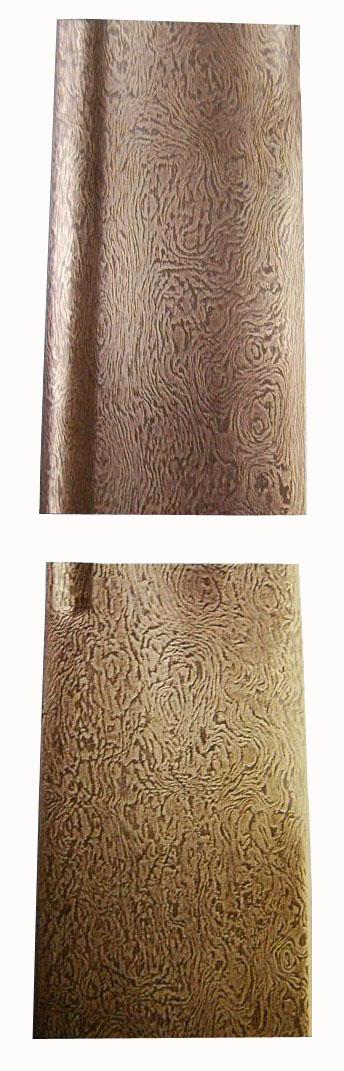
"Woodgrain" pattern of a sword blade made of crucible steel, Zand or Early Qajar period: (Zand) 1750–1794 AD; (Qajar) 1794–1952 AD, Iran.(Moshtagh Khorasani 2006, 516)

Variations of co-fusion process have been found primarily in Persia and Central Asia but have also been found in Hyderabad, India called Deccani or Hyderabad process. For the carbon, a variety of organic materials are specified by the contemporary Islamic authorities, including pomegranate rinds, acorns, fruit skins like orange peel, leaves as well as the white of egg and shells. Slivers of wood are mentioned in some of the Indian sources, but significantly none of the sources mention charcoal.

== Early history ==
Crucible steel is generally attributed to production centres in India and Sri Lanka where it was produced using the so-called "wootz" process, and it is assumed that its appearance in other locations was due to long-distance trade. Only recently it has become apparent that places in Central Asia like Merv in Turkmenistan and Akhsiket in Uzbekistan were important centres of production of crucible steel. The Central Asian finds are all from excavations and date from the 8th to 12th centuries CE, while the Indian/Sri Lankan material is as early as 300 BCE. India's iron ore had trace vanadium and other alloying elements leading to increased hardenability in Indian crucible steel which was famous throughout the middle east for its ability to retain an edge.

While crucible steel is more attributed to the Middle East in early times, pattern welded swords, incorporating high-carbon, and likely crucible steel, have been discovered in Europe, from the 3rd century CE, particularly in Scandinavia. Swords bearing the brand name Ulfberht, and dating to a 200-year period from the 9th century to the early 11th century, are prime examples of the technique. It is speculated by many that the process of making these blades originated in the Middle East and subsequently had been traded during the Volga Trade Route days.

In the first centuries of the Islamic period, some scientific studies on swords and steel appeared. The best known of these are by Jabir ibn Hayyan 8th century, al-Kindi 9th century, Al-Biruni in the early 11th century, al-Tarsusi in the late 12th century, and Fakhr-i-Mudabbir 13th century. Any of these contains far more information about Indian and damascene steels than appears in the entire surviving literature of classical Greece and Rome.

=== South India and Sri Lanka ===
There are many ethnographic accounts of Indian crucible steel production; however, scientific investigations of the remains of crucible steel production have only been published for four regions: three in India and one in Sri Lanka. Indian/Sri Lankan crucible steel is commonly referred to as wootz, which is generally agreed to be an English corruption of the word ukko (in the Canarese language) or hookoo (in the Telugu language).

European accounts from the 17th century onwards have referred to the repute and manufacture of "wootz", a traditional crucible steel made specially in parts of southern India in the former provinces of Golconda, Mysore and Salem. As yet the scale of excavations and surface surveys is too limited to link the literary accounts to archaeometallurgical evidence.

The proven sites of crucible steel production in south India, e.g. at Konasamudram and Gatihosahalli, date from at least the late medieval period, 16th century. One of the earliest known potential sites, which shows some promising preliminary evidence that may be linked to ferrous crucible processes in Kodumanal, near Coimbatore in Tamil Nadu. The site is dated between the third century BCE and the third century CE. By the seventeenth century the main centre of crucible steel production seems to have been in Hyderabad. The process was apparently quite different from that recorded elsewhere. Wootz from Hyderabad or the Deccani process for making watered blades involved a co-fusion of two different kinds of iron: one was low in carbon and the other was a high-carbon steel or cast iron. Wootz steel was widely exported and traded throughout ancient Europe, China, the Arab world, and became particularly famous in the Middle East, where it became known as Damascus steel.

Recent archaeological investigations have suggested that Sri Lanka also supported innovative technologies for iron and steel production in antiquity. The Sri Lankan system of crucible steel making was partially independent of the various Indian and Middle Eastern systems. Their method was something similar to the method of carburization of wrought iron. The earliest confirmed crucible steel site is located in the Knuckles range in the northern area of the Central Highlands of Sri Lanka dated to 6th–10th centuries CE. In the twelfth century the land of Serendib (Sri Lanka) seems to have been the main supplier of crucible steel, but over the centuries production slipped back, and by the nineteenth century just a small industry survived in the Balangoda district of the central southern highlands.

A series of excavations at Samanalawewa indicated the unexpected and previously unknown technology of west-facing smelting sites, which are different types of steel production. These furnaces were used for direct smelting to steel. These are named "west facing" because they were located on the western sides of hilltops to use the prevailing wind in the smelting process. Sri Lankan furnace steels were known and traded between the 9th and 11th centuries and earlier, but apparently not later. These sites were dated to the 7th–11th centuries. The coincidence of this dating with the 9th century Islamic reference to Sarandib is of great importance. The crucible process existed in India at the same time that the west- facing technology was operating in Sri Lanka. Excavations of the Yodhawewa (near Mannar) site (in 2018) have uncovered a lower half of a bottom spherical furnace and crucible fragments used to make crucible steel in Sri Lanka during the 7th-8th centuries AD. The crucible fragments uncovered at the site were similar to the elongated tube-shaped crucibles of Samanalawewa.

=== Central Asia ===
Central Asia has a rich history of crucible steel production, beginning during the late 1st millennium CE. From the sites in modern Uzbekistan and Merv in Turkmenistan, there is good archaeological evidence for the large scale production of crucible steel. They all belong in broad terms to the same early medieval period between the late 8th or early 9th and the late 12th century CE, contemporary with the early crusades.

The two most prominent crucible steel sites in eastern Uzbekistan carrying the Ferghana Process are Akhsiket and Pap in the Ferghana Valley, whose position within the Great Silk Road has been historically and archaeologically proved. The material evidence consists of large number of archaeological finds relating to steel making from 9th–12th centuries CE in the form of hundreds of thousands of fragments of crucibles, often with massive slag cakes. Archaeological work at Akhsiket, has identified that the crucible steel process was of the carburization of iron metal. This process appears to be typical of and restricted to the Ferghana Valley in eastern Uzbekistan, and it is therefore called the Ferghana Process. This process lasted in that region for roughly four centuries.

Evidence of the production of crucible steel have been found in Merv, Turkmenistan, a major city on the 'Silk Road'. The Islamic scholar al-Kindi (801–866 CE) mentions that during the ninth century CE the region of Khorasan, the area to which the cities Nishapur, Merv, Herat and Balkh belong, was a steel manufacturing centre. Evidence from a metallurgical workshop at Merv, dated to the ninth- early tenth century CE, provides an illustration of the co-fusion method of steel production in crucibles, about 1000 years earlier than the distinctly different wootz process. The crucible steel process at Merv might be seen as technologically related to what Bronson (1986, 43) calls Hyderabad process, a variation of the wootz process, after the location of the process documented by Voysey in the 1820s.

=== China ===
By the Han dynasty (202 BC–AD 220), Chinese metallurgists produced cast iron, wrought iron, and steel. Crucibles dating to the Han period and capable of high-temperature steelmaking have been found, including examples with molten steel residue. However, Wagner notes that this does not establish the deliberate production of liquid crucible steel, treating it only as a possibility. Chinese metallurgists also developed co-fusion steelmaking, in which cast iron and wrought iron were combined to produce steel; the earliest surviving description of this process dating to the 6th century AD.

In 1064, Shen Kuo described both co-fusion steelmaking and composite sword construction using harder steel for the edge and softer wrought iron for the spine. He also described patterned blades known as “coiled steel” or “fir-patterned” swords.

== Modern history ==
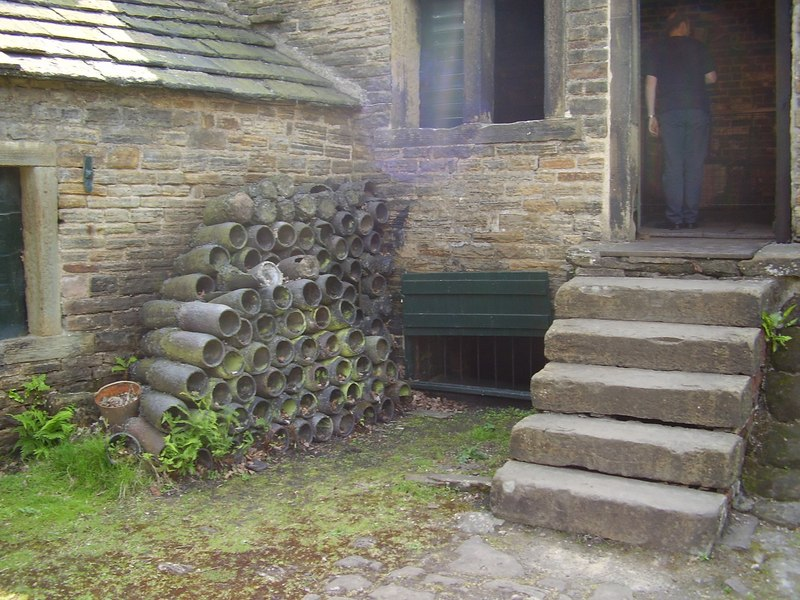
Crucibles next to the furnace room at Abbeydale, Sheffield

Benjamin Huntsman, a clockmaker working in Handsworth near Sheffield, England, and in search of a better steel for clock springs, began producing his own steel, in 1740, after years of experimenting. Huntsman's system used a coke-fired furnace capable of reaching 1,600 °C, into which up to twelve clay crucibles, each capable of holding about 15 kg of iron, were placed. When the crucibles or "pots" were white-hot, they were charged with lumps of blister steel, an alloy of iron and carbon produced by the cementation process, and a glass shard flux to help remove impurities. The pots were removed after about 3 hours in the furnace, impurities in the form of slag skimmed off, and the molten steel poured into moulds to end up as cast ingots. Complete melting of the steel produced a highly uniform crystal structure upon cooling, which gave the metal increased tensile strength and hardness in comparison with other steels being made at the time.

Before the introduction of Huntsman's technique, Sheffield produced about 200 tonnes of steel per year from Swedish wrought iron (see Oregrounds iron). The introduction of Huntsman's technique changed this radically: one hundred years later the amount had risen to over 80,000 tonnes per year, or almost half of Europe's total production. Sheffield developed from a small township into one of Europe's leading industrial cities.

The steel was produced in specialised workshops called 'crucible furnaces', which consisted of a workshop at ground level and a subterranean cellar. The furnace buildings varied in size and architectural style, growing in size towards the latter part of the 19th century as technological developments enabled multiple pots to be "fired" at once, using gas as a heating fuel. Each workshop had a series of standard features, such as rows of melting holes, teaming pits, roof vents, rows of shelving for the crucible pots and annealing furnaces to prepare each pot before firing. Ancillary rooms for weighing each charge and for the manufacture of the clay crucibles were either attached to the workshop, or located within the cellar complex. The steel, originally intended for making clock springs, was later used in other applications such as scissors, axes and swords.

Sheffield's Abbeydale Industrial Hamlet operates for the public a scythe-making works, which dates from Huntsman's times and is powered by a water wheel, using crucible steel made at the site.

=== Material properties ===
Previous to Huntsman, the most common method of producing steel was the manufacture of shear steel. In this method, blister steel produced by cementation was used, which consisted of a core of wrought iron surrounded by a shell of very high-carbon steel, typically ranging from 1.5 to 2.0% carbon. To help homogenize the steel, it was pounded into flat plates, which were stacked and forge welded together. This produced steel with alternating layers of steel and iron. The resulting billet could then be hammered flat, cut into plates, which were stacked and welded again, thinning and compounding the layers, and evening out the carbon more as it slowly diffused out of the high-carbon steel into the lower-carbon iron. However, the more the steel was heated and worked, the more it tended to decarburize, and this outward diffusion occurs much faster than the inward diffusion between layers. Thus, further attempts to homogenize the steel resulted in a carbon content too low for use in items like springs, cutlery, swords, or tools. Therefore, steel intended for use in such items, especially tools, was still being made primarily by the slow and arduous bloomery process in very small amounts and at high cost, which, albeit better, had to be manually separated from the wrought iron and was still impossible to fully homogenize in the solid state.

Huntsman's process was the first to produce a fully homogeneous steel. Unlike previous methods of steel production, the Huntsman process was the first to fully melt the steel, allowing the full diffusion of carbon throughout the liquid. With the use of fluxes it also allowed the removal of most impurities, producing the first steel of modern quality. Due to carbon's high melting point (nearly triple that of steel) and its tendency to oxidize (burn) at high temperatures, it cannot usually be added directly to molten steel. However, by adding wrought iron or pig iron, allowing it to dissolve into the liquid, the carbon content could be carefully regulated (in a way similar to Asian crucible-steels but without the stark inhomogeneities indicative of those steels). Another benefit was that it allowed other elements to be alloyed with the steel. Huntsman was one of the first to begin experimenting with the addition of alloying agents like manganese to help remove impurities such as oxygen from the steel. His process was later used by many others, such as Robert Hadfield and Robert Forester Mushet, to produce the first alloy steels like mangalloy, high-speed steel, and stainless steel.

Due to variations in the carbon content of the blister steel, the carbon steel produced could vary in carbon content between crucibles by as much as 0.18%, but on average produced a eutectoid steel containing ~ 0.79% carbon. Due to the quality and high hardenability of the steel, it was quickly adopted for the manufacture of tool steel, machine tools, cutlery, and many other items. Because no oxygen was blown through the steel, it exceeded Bessemer steel in both quality and hardenability, so Huntsman's process was used for manufacturing tool steel until better methods, utilizing an electric arc, were developed in the early 20th century.

=== 19th and 20th century ===
A Scottish engineer, David Mushet, investigated and was able to infer that Indian wootz was made by fusion, developing and patenting a process to emulate its manufacture from iron. David Mushet sold the rights to his process to Sheffield foundries in 1800. He made his report in 1805.

In another method, developed in the United States in the 1880s, iron and carbon were melted together directly to produce crucible steel. Throughout the 19th century and into the 1920s a large amount of crucible steel was directed into the production of cutting tools, where it was called tool steel.

The crucible process continued to be used for specialty steels, but is today obsolete. Similar quality steels are now made with an electric arc furnace. Some uses of tool steel were displaced, first by high-speed steel and later by materials such as tungsten carbide.

=== Elsewhere ===
Russian metallurgist Pavel Petrovich Anosov (see Bulat steel) was able to reproduce ancient wootz steel with nearly all of its properties and the steel he created was very similar to traditional wootz. He documented four different methods of producing wootz steel that exhibited traditional patterns. His work titled “On Bulat Steels” was published in the Mining Journal (ru:Горный журнал).

In the United States crucible steel was pioneered by William Metcalf.

=== Academic Wootz Steel research ===
The first European references to crucible steel seem to be no earlier than the Post Medieval period. European experiments with "Damascus" steels go back to at least the sixteenth century, but it was not until the 1790s that laboratory researchers began to work with steels that were specifically known to be Indian/wootz. At this time, Europeans knew of India's ability to make crucible steel from reports brought back by travellers who had observed the process at several places in southern India.

From the mid-17th century onwards, European travellers to the Indian subcontinent wrote numerous vivid eyewitness accounts of the production of steel there. These include accounts by Jean-Baptiste Tavernier in 1679, Francis Buchanan in 1807, and H.W. Voysey in 1832. The 18th, 19th and early 20th century saw a heady period of European interest in trying to understand the nature and properties of wootz steel. Indian wootz engaged the attention of some of the best-known scientists. One was Michael Faraday who was fascinated by wootz steel. It was probably the investigations of George Pearson, reported at the Royal Society in 1795, which had the most far-reaching impact in terms of kindling interest in wootz amongst European scientists. He was the first of these scientists to publish his results and, incidentally, the first to use the word "wootz" in print.

In 1998, John Verhoeven and Alfred Pendray published their research on the historic techniques used to produce Wotz steel.

== See also ==
- Damascus steel
- Noric steel
- Pattern welding

== Notes ==
=== References ===
- Bronson, B. (1986). "The Making and Selling of Wootz, a Crucible Steel of India". Archeomaterials. 1 (1): 13–51.
- Craddock, P.T. (1995). Early Metal Mining and Production. Cambridge: Edinburgh University Press.
- Craddock, P.T. (2003). "Cast Iron, Fined Iron, Crucible Steel: Liquid Iron in the Ancient World". In Craddock, P.T.; Lang, J. (eds.). Mining and Metal Production through the Ages. London: The British Museum Press. pp. 231–257.
- Feuerbach, A.M. (2002). Crucible Steel in Central Asia: Production, Use, and Origins (PhD Dissertation thesis). University of London.
- Feuerbach, A.; Griffiths, D. R.; Merkel, J.F. (1997). "Production of crucible steel by co-fusion: Archaeometallurgical evidence from the ninth- early tenth century at the site of Merv, Turkmenistan". In Druzik, J.R.; Merkel, J.F.; Stewart, J.; Vandiver, P.B. (eds.). Materials issues in art and archaeology V: symposium held 3–5 December 1996, Boston, Massachusetts. Pittsburgh, Pa: Materials Research Society. pp. 105–109.
- Feuerbach, A.; Griffiths, D.; Merkel, J.F. (1995). "Analytical Investigation of Crucible Steel Production at Merv, Turkmenistan". IAMS. 19: 12–14.
- Feuerbach, A.M.; Griffiths, D.R.; Merkel, J.F. (1998). "An examination of crucible steel in the manufacture of Damascus steel, including evidence from Merv, Turkmenistan". Metallurgica Antiqua. 8: 37–44.
- Feuerbach, A.M.; Griffiths, D.R.; Merkel, J.F. (2003). "Early Islamic Crucible Steel Production at Merv, Turkmenistan". In Craddock, P.T.; Lang, J. (eds.). Mining and Metal Production through the Ages. London: The British Museum Press. pp. 258–266.
- Freestone, I.C.; Tite, M.S. (1986). "Refractories in the Ancient and Preindustrial World". In Kingery, W.D.; Lense, E. (eds.). High technology ceramics: past, present, and future; the nature of innovation and change in ceramic technology. Westerville, OH: American Ceramic Society. pp. 35–63.
- Juleff, G. (1998). Early Iron and Steel in Sri Lanka: a study of the Samanalawewa area. Mainz am Rhein: von Zabern.
- Moshtagh Khorasani, M. (2006). Arms and Armor from Iran, the Bronze Age to the End of the Qajar Period. Tübingen: Legat.
- Needham, J. (1958). The development of iron and steel technology in China. Second biennial Dickinson Memorial Lecture to the Newcomen Society, 1900–1995. Newcomen Society.
- Papakhristu, O.A.; Rehren, Th. (2002). "Techniques and Technology of Ceramic Vessel Manufacture Crucibles for Wootz Smelting in Central Asia". In Kilikoglou, V.; Hein, A.; Maniatis, Y. (eds.). Modern Trends in Scientific Studies on Ancient Ceramics, papers presented at the 5th European Meeting on Ancient Ceramics, Athens 1999. Oxford: Archaeopress. pp. 69–74.
- Ranganathan, S.; Srinivasan, Sh. (2004). India's Legendary Wootz Steel, and Advanced Material of the Ancient World. Bangalore: National Institute of Advanced Studies: Indian Institute of Science.
- Rehren, Th.; Papachristou, O. (2003). "Similar like White and Black: a Comparison of Steel-making Crucibles from Central Asia and the Indian Subcontinent". In Stöllner, Th. (ed.). Man and mining: Mensch und Bergbau: studies in honour of Gerd Weisgerber on occasion of his 65th birthday. Bochum: Deutsches Bergbau-Museum. pp. 393–404.
- Rehren, Th.; Papakhristu, O. (2000). "Cutting Edge Technology – the Ferghana Process of Medieval Crucible Steel Smelting". Metalla. 7 (2): 55–69.
- Srinivasan, Sh. (1994). "Wootz crucible steel: a newly discovered production site in south India". Institute of Archaeology, University College London. 5: 49–61.
- Srinivasan, Sh.; Griffiths, D. (1997). "Crucible Steel in South India-Preliminary Investigations on Crucibles from Some Newly Identified Sites". In Druzik, J.R.; Merkel, J.F.; Stewart, J.; Vandiver, P.B. (eds.). Materials issues in art and archaeology V: symposium held 3–5 December 1996, Boston, Massachusetts. Pittsburgh, Pa: Materials Research Society. pp. 111–125.
- Srinivasan, S.; Griffiths, D. "South Indian wootz: evidence for high-carbon steel from crucibles from a newly identified site and preliminary comparisons with related finds". Material Issues in Art and Archaeology-V. Materials Research Society Symposium Proceedings Series. Vol. 462.
- Srinivasan, S.; Ranganathan, S. "Wootz Steel: An Advanced Material of the Ancient World". Bangalore: Indian Institute of Science. Archived from the original on 11 February 2019.
- Wayman, Michael L. (2000). The Ferrous Metallurgy of Early Clocks and Watches. The British Museum.
- Williams, Alan (3 May 2012). The Sword and the Crucible: A History of the Metallurgy of European Swords Up to the 16th Century. BRILL. ISBN 978-90-04-22783-5.
