= Statue of Yuriy Dolgorukiy, Moscow =

Equestrian statue in Moscow, Russia

Statue of Yuriy Dolgorukiy in Moscow
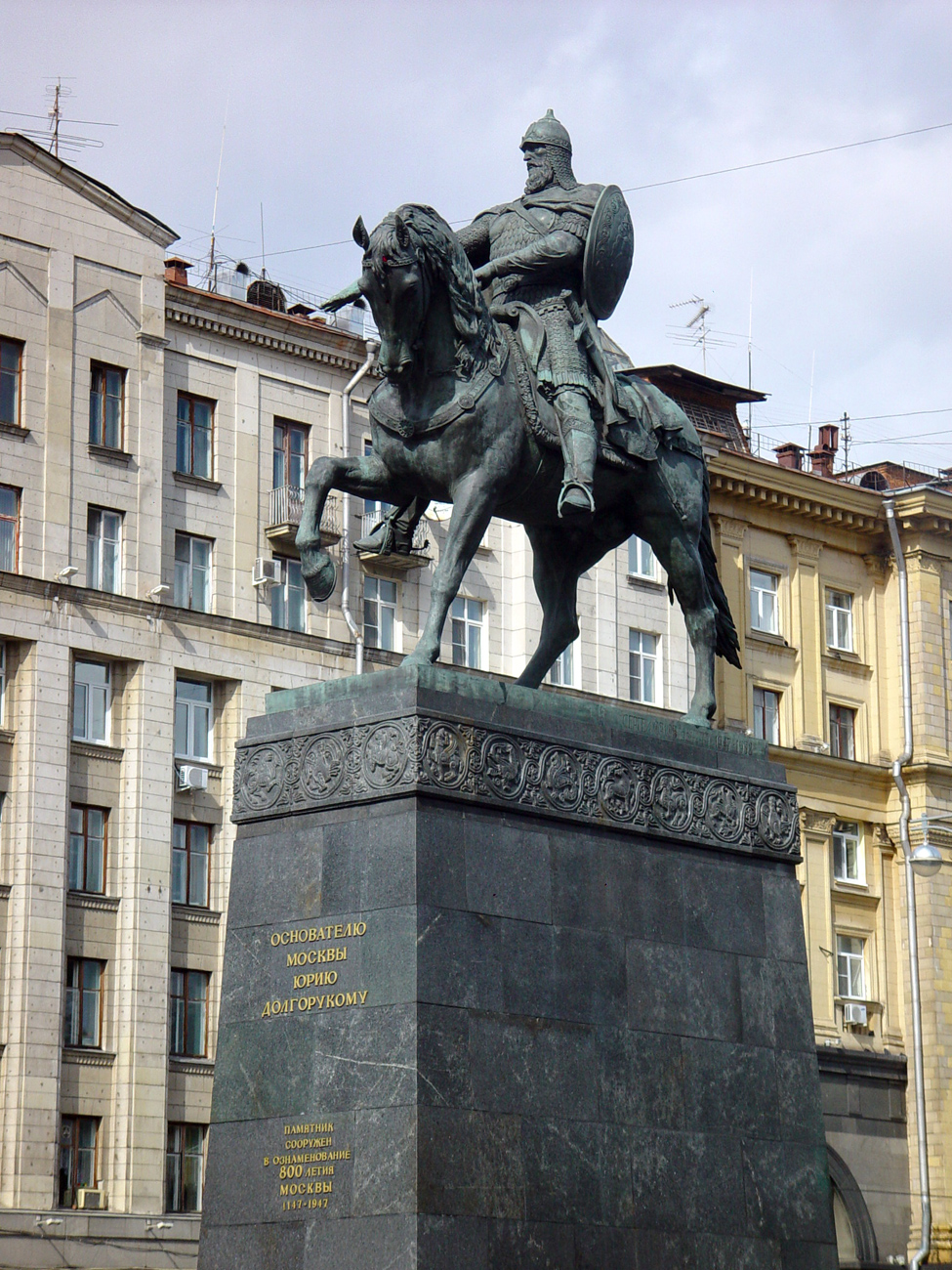
- Statue of Yuriy Dolgorukiy, 2004
- Artist: S. Orlov, A. Antropov, N. Shtamm, V. Andreyev
- Year: 1954
- Type: Bronze statue
- Location: Tverskaya Square, Moscow

The Statue of Yuriy Dolgorukiy is an equestrian statue which commemorates the founding of Moscow in 1147 by Yuriy Dolgorukiy (1099 – 1157). Dolgorukiy was the Grand Prince (Velikiy Knyaz) of the Kievan Rus' (Kiev) and a member of the Rurik dynasty. On 6 June 1954, the statue was erected on Soviet Square (now Tverskaya Square), located in front of the Mossoviet building (now the building of the Mayor of Moscow). The sculptors were Sergei Mikhailovich Orlov, A. P. Antropov, and Nicholay Lvovich Shtamm. The architectural design was by Viktor Semenovich Andreyev. The statue replaced the Monument to the Soviet Constitution, which had been demolished in 1941.

== Skobelev statue ==
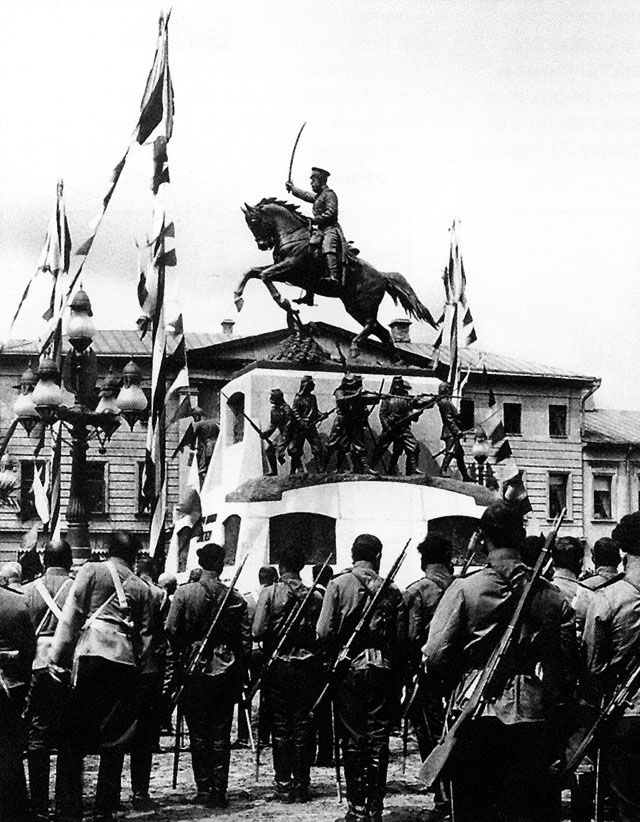
Inauguration of the Monument to General Skobelev

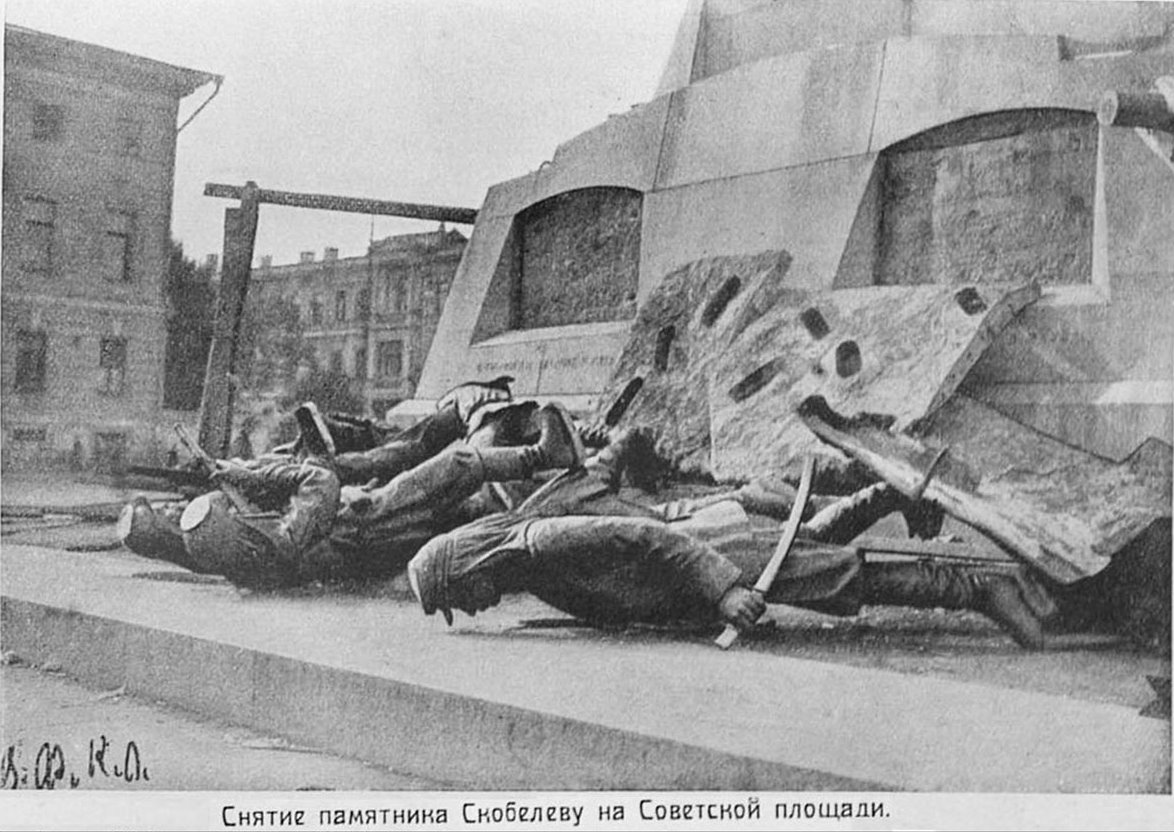
The Skobelev statue being dismantled

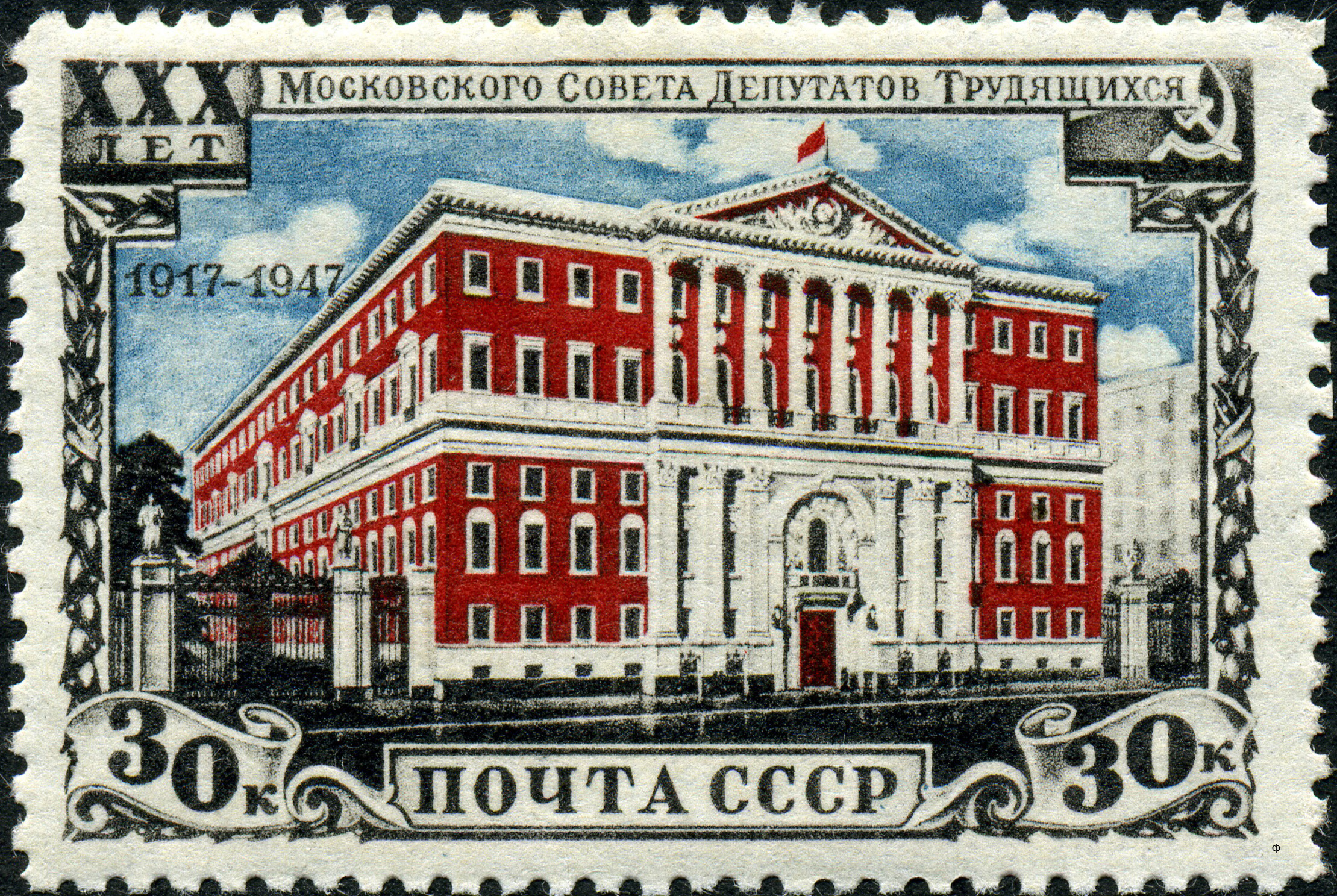
Moscow City Hall, behind the Statue of Liberty

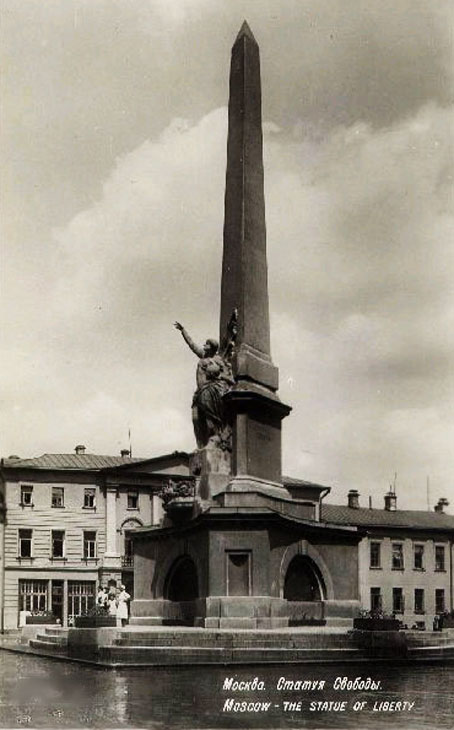
Monument to the Soviet Constitution

The original statue erected in 1912 in Tverskaya Square was of General Mikhail Skobelev, a hero of the Russian-Turkish War of 1877. The Monument to General Skobelev depicted him mounted on his horse. The monument was known as "The White General". Skobelev wore a white parade tunic and rode a white horse into battle. He was also a member of the Tsar's military force and therefore a "White".

Following the October Revolution of 1917, a decree concerning monuments "erected in honour of tsars and their servants" was issued. It was part of Lenin's campaign of propaganda through monuments. Because of this decree, the Skobelev monument was removed.

== Constitution obelisk ==
In 1918, the Skobelev monument was replaced by the Monument to the Soviet Constitution.

In June 1919, the obelisk was joined by a statue of liberty. It was created by the sculptor, Nikolay Andreyevich Andreyev. Vera Alekseyeva, the niece of Konstantin Stanislavski, might have posed for this statue. Another possible model was the actress at МХАТ, Eugenie Khovanskaya, who was famous for her beauty.

The monument did not stand for long. By the end of the 1930s, it required complete restoration. It had been hastily and cheaply made from low-grade materials; the obelisk was built in brick and plastered "like granite". The statue was cast in concrete. On 22 April 1941, before it could be restored, the monument was blown up and removed. The head of the Statue of Liberty survived and was placed in the Tretyakov Gallery

== Creation of the statue ==
A settlement had existed at the site of Moscow at least 200 years prior to its official founding in 1147 by Yuriy Dolgorukiy. However, the 800th anniversary of Moscow celebrations in September 1947 accepted the traditional date.

In 1946, Joseph Vissarionovich Stalin sent the archaeologist and anthropologist Mikhail Mikhaylovich Gerasimov (1907 – 1970) from Kiev to find remains of Yuriy Dolgoruky. This was so that a ceremonious reburial of Dolgoruky could take place during the celebrations. No remains were found at Dolgoruky's grave.

In September 1946, a competition to design the Dolgorukiy monument was held. The sculptor S.M. Orlov won the competition and was awarded the Stalin Prize for his work. The Russian writer, journalist, and historian Aleksandr Anatoliyevich Vaskin said that Stalin selected Orlov's entry from amongst the other entries because it was praised by the United States ambassador W. Averell Harriman (1891 – 1986) during a Moscow Kremlin reception.

On 6 September 1947, the groundbreaking ceremony for the monument took place during the celebrations. However, the monument took some time to build. Disagreements took place between the three artists. The scale of Orlov's design and technique's were questioned. His usual small sculpture techniques might not have worked on a monumental work.

Orlov also clashed with authorities. He opposed to the text on the monument dedication, reading, "To the founder of Moscow from the Soviet government". (The Soviet government is not mentioned on the monument.) Insufficient funding also affected the speed of work. Moscow's anniversary marked the simultaneous launches of several large-scale projects all of which required special funding. These included the building of the "Stalin skyscrapers".

A possibly apocryphal story tells of Stalin's approval of the final version of the monument. He carefully considered the model and said, "Why do you, Comrade Orlov, have Dolgorukiy sit on the mare? A stallion can accentuate the masculinity of the founder of Moscow". Changes were introduced to the project immediately.

The sculpture was produced by the "Mytishchi Plant in honour of the national artist E. F. Belashova". The production was supervised by sculptor and bronze caster Gabriel Ivanovich Savinsky. It cost 5.5 million roubles paid by the city of Moscow. The grand opening of the monument took place on 6 June 1954.

== Artistic characteristics ==
The images of the prince have not survived, therefore the authors of the sculpture have created a collective image of a Russian hero on a fighting horse, dressed in martial armor. The rider, having stopped the horse and raised in the stirrups, with an imperious gesture as if indicating the place for a new fortress.

The pedestal of the monument is decorated on top with an ornamental carving on the motifs of reliefs of the monument of ancient Russian architecture - the Cathedral of St George in Yuriev Polsky. The carvings depict a centaur, a Syrin bird, a basilisk, the Phoenix bird, gryphons and the stylized images of a lion and a stag. It is noteworthy that along with folklore images of Slavonic mythology in the relief are widely used antique motifs, perceived by Old Russian masters through the Byzantine art.

== Reception ==
Reactions were mixed to the building of the Dolgorukiy monument. The monument did not reflect the ideology of the Communist Party. Dolgorukiy had previously been officially considered an "exploiter of the peasantry and the tax collector of the feudal system".

At the unveiling of the statue, the writer, Zinovy Samoylovich Papernov said, "It is not a good likeness". However the composer, Sigizmund Abramovich Kats disagreed, and said, "It is a good likeness".

== See also ==
- Statue of Graf Vorontsov, Odessa
- Statue of Metallurgist Anosov, Zlatoust
