= Sergei Orlov (sculptor) =

- Born: Sergei Mikhailovich Orlov; September 14, 1911; Saint Petersburg, Russian Empire
- Died: November 18, 1971 (aged 60); Moscow, RSFSR, Soviet Union
- Known for: Painter, ceramicist and sculptor
- Notable work: Statue of Yuriy Dolgorukiy
- Awards: Stalin Prize

Sergei Mikhailovich Orlov (Russian: Сергей Михайлович Орлов; 14 September 1911 – 18 November 1971) was a Soviet painter, ceramicist and sculptor specializing in depicting Russian historical figures.

Orlov worked in ceramics and porcelain for decades until his first large-scale commission, the 1954 equestrian statue of Yuri Dolgorukiy on Tverskaya Street, which he won by competition. Other work includes the 1955 monument to Russian explorer Afanasy Nikitin in his medieval home of Tver, a group called "Belorussian Partisan" in a passage in the Belorusskaya (Koltsevaya line) station of the Moscow Metro, and work on the Main Gate of the Exhibition of Achievements of National Economy.
