= Gocha Laghidze =

Dutch-Georgian weapon smith

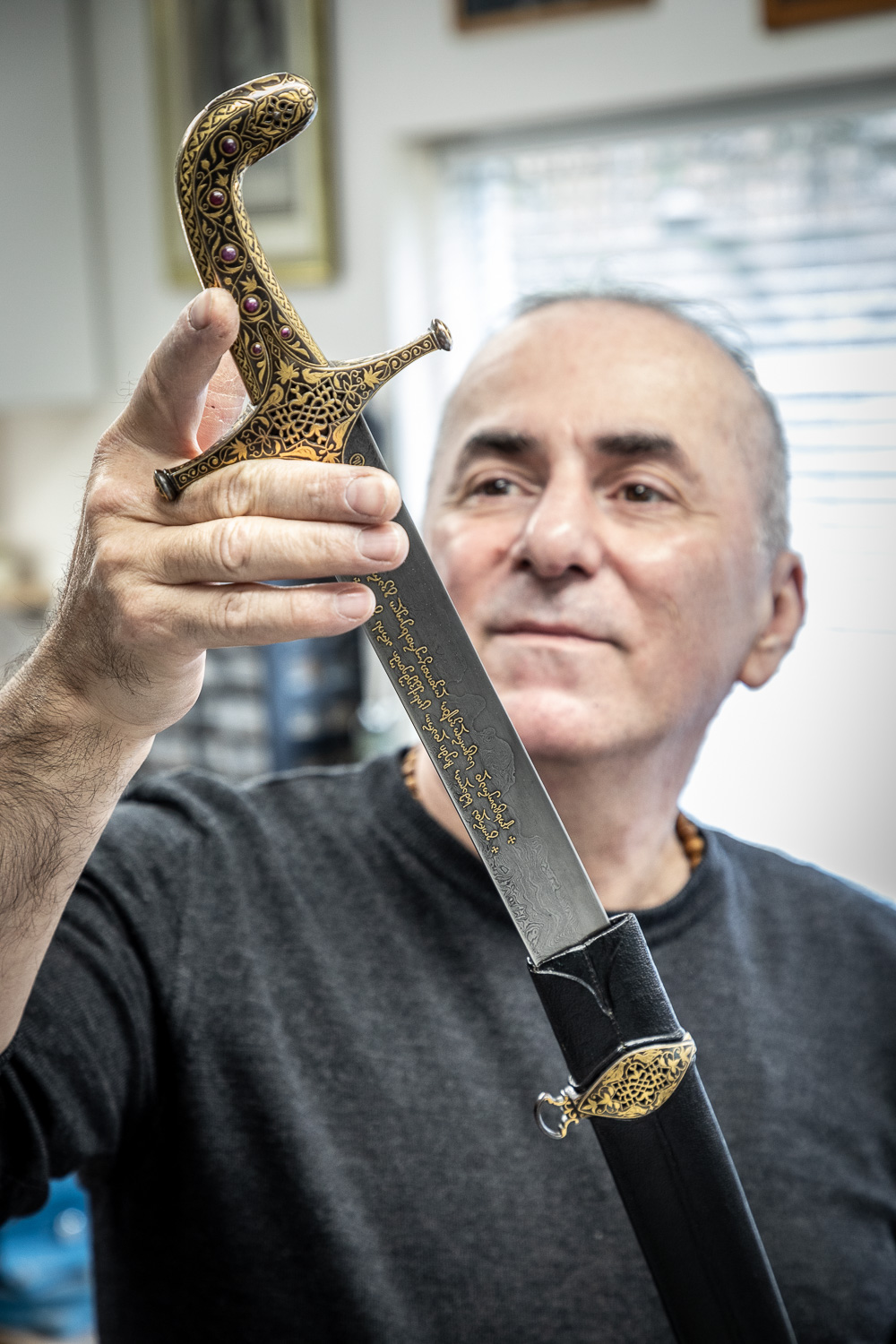
- Laghidze in 2022
- Born: გოჩა ლაღიძე March 18, 1965 (age 61); Tbilisi, Georgia
- Known for: Bladesmith, goldsmith, restorator, metalartist
- Notable work: Reconstruction of the armour of Maurice of Orange
- Website: Gotscha.nl

Gocha Laghidze (გოჩა ლაღიძე, March 18, 1965 — present) is a Dutch-Georgian metal artist and armorer. He specializes in the reconstruction and restoration of medieval armor and weaponry.

Laghidze's work involves studying the historical context and original craftsmanship of the objects he handles. His work is characterized by craftsmanship with an artistic touch. The Dutch Ministry of Education, Culture and Science considers his work to be of essential importance to Dutch cultural heritage.

== Youth and education ==
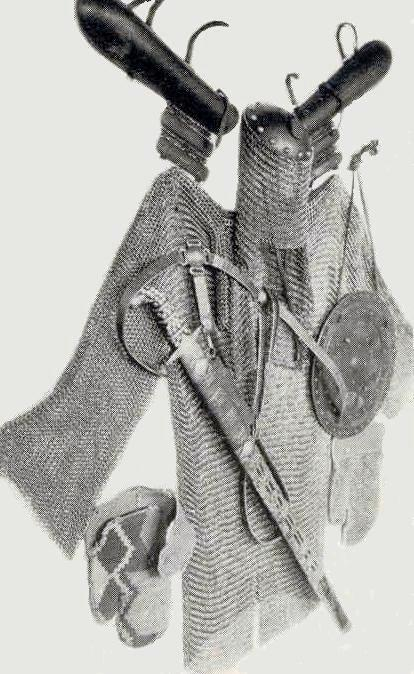
Traditional Georgian chain mail armour, first production by Laghidze.

Gocha Laghidze was born in 1965 in Tbilisi into a family that was part of the intelligentsia in Georgia, which was then part of the Soviet Union. In elementary and high school, he showed talent in painting, mathematics, and physics.

In 1979, he attended a special high school. His history teacher there, Juansher Jurkhadze, was a collector of antique art and sparked Laghidze's interest in swords and armor. With his support, Laghidze made a sample of chain mail. He then crafted a traditional helmet. Jurkhadze was impressed by his work and gave him a Persian shield from his collection.

== Education and early work ==
Laghidze was seventeen when he went to the Polytechnic Institute (now the Georgian Technical University) and graduated in 1989 as an electrical engineer, though he would never use this degree. During his studies, he got married. To fund his wedding, he sold his handmade helmets at a flea market. He received a good price for his work. Laghidze realized then that he could make money with his talent and continued in the field of historical armor reconstruction.

In addition to his studies, he took a course on Georgian weaponry, researched traditional armor and swords, and regularly visited the Simon Janashia Museum of Georgia. From 1985, he worked on reconstructing a traditional Georgian armor, an Abjari. From 1987, he worked part-time at the Art Combine in Tbilisi and completed personal commissions for artist Zurab Tsereteli.

He made a complete armor, which was written about in the Georgian newspaper Achalgazrda Komunisti in 1988. This led to significant commissions and a presentation on Georgian television. His work was praised by experts such as Kote Cholokashvili, art critic Guram Gabashvili, and artist Temur Sulkhanishvili.

After completing his university studies in 1989, Laghidze started working as a metal restorer at the National Monument Protection Service at the Open-Air Museum of Ethnography in Tbilisi.

His work was selected by the Ministry of Culture for exhibitions at the Artists' House in Tbilisi and a show in Burg Hasseg/Hall in Tyrol, Austria. He carried out restoration projects and researched traditional methods for making Georgian steel, known as bulati, used to manufacture high-quality weapons.

The period when the former Soviet Union collapsed and Georgia became independent in 1991 was difficult for Laghidze. He did his military service and faced disappointments. He no longer felt at home in Georgia and, after several commissions from Dutch museums, immigrated with his family to the Netherlands.

== The Netherlands ==
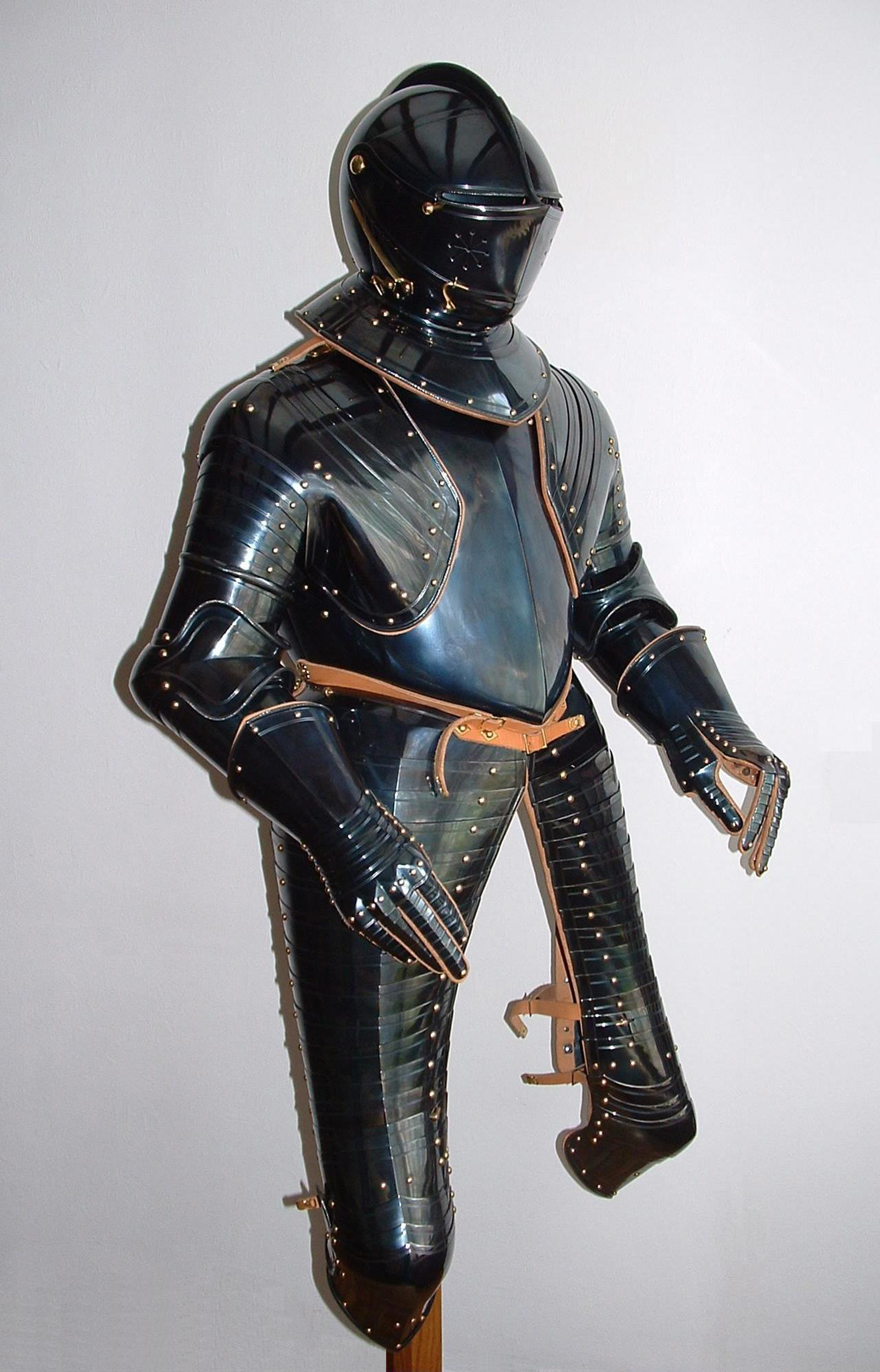
Replica (1997) by Laghidze of the armour of Maurice of Orange

Since 1995, Laghidze has lived and worked in the Netherlands. His rise to fame began with a Georgian armor he made, exhibited at the Juttersmuseum on Texel. This caught the attention of Jan Piet Puype, curator of the Dutch Army Museum in Delft, which led to major commissions.

In 1997, Laghidze was invited by the European Center for Monument Care at UNESCO in Venice. In 1998, on the occasion of the 400th anniversary of the Peace of Münster, he made a replica of Maurice of Orange’s armor from 1590 for the Army Museum in Delft. This was seen as a masterpiece that earned him much recognition. Laghidze has also completed personal commissions, such as for Henk Visser, patron and owner of the Visser Collection in Wassenaar.

In 2001–2002, Laghidze gave lectures in Amsterdam at the Netherlands Institute for Cultural Heritage (ICN). From the same period onwards, he runs his own studio in Roosendaal. In 2004, he became a naturalized Dutch citizen, a process facilitated by the Dutch Ministry of Education, Culture and Science recognizing his work as a significant contribution to Dutch cultural heritage.

In 2022, an overview exhibition of his work was held at the Markiezenhof in Bergen op Zoom, titled The Iron Secret Keeper. In this exhibition, he aimed to show the connection between the Markiezenhof and Georgia, as several marquises from Bergen op Zoom were members of the Order of the Golden Fleece, an exclusive knightly order that was originally Georgian.
