= Zlatoust =

City in Chelyabinsk Oblast, Russia

Zlatoust Златоуст
- City
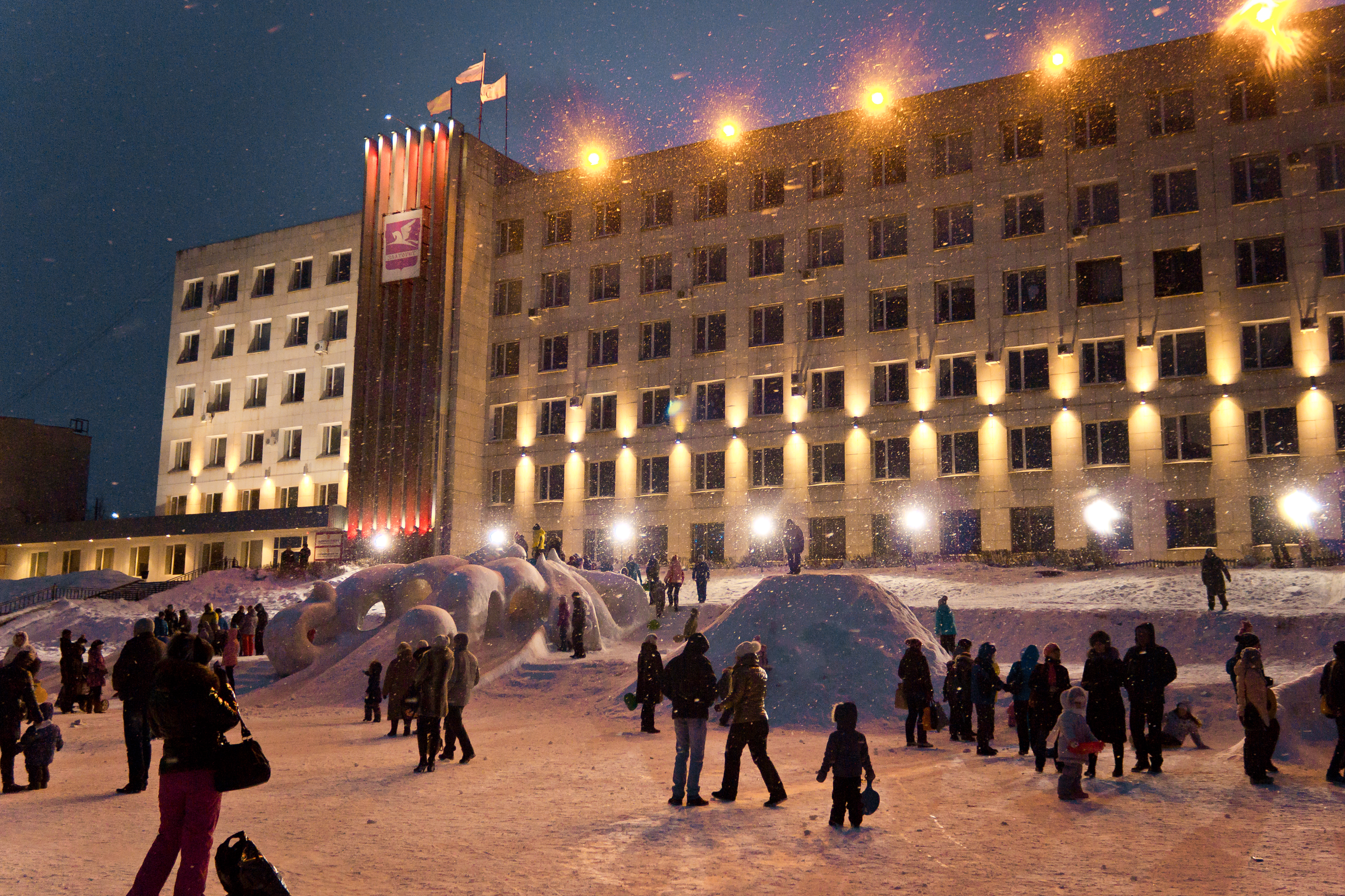
- New Year's Square, Zlatoust

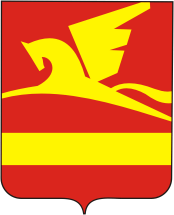
- Flag Coat of arms
- Interactive map of Zlatoust
- Location of Zlatoust Zlatoust (Chelyabinsk Oblast)
- Coordinates: 55°10′N 59°40′E
- Country: Russia
- Federal subject: Chelyabinsk Oblast
- Founded: 1754

Government
  - Urban district head: Oleg Reshetnikov
- Elevation: 125 m (410 ft)

Population (2010 Census)
  - Total: 174,962
  - Estimate (2025): 157,244 (−10.1%)
  - Rank: 103rd in 2010

Administrative status
  - Subordinated to: City of Zlatoust
  - Capital of: City of Zlatoust

Municipal status
  - Urban okrug: Zlatoustovsky Urban Okrug
  - Capital of: Zlatoustovsky Urban Okrug
- Time zone: UTC+5 (MSK+2)
- Postal code: 456200
- Dialing code: +7 3513
- OKTMO ID: 75712000001
- Website: www.zlatoust.info

Zlatoust (Russian: Златоуст; IPA: [zlətɐˈust]) is a city in Chelyabinsk Oblast, Russia, located on the Ay River (in the Kama basin), 160 kilometers (99 mi) west of Chelyabinsk. Population: 174,962 (2010 census); 194,551 (2002 census); 207,794 (1989 Soviet census).

== Etymology ==
The city's name is supposedly derived from the Russian translation of "Chrysostom", literally "golden-mouthed" in the original Greek, for Saint John Chrysostom, because the city was founded near a church dedicated to that saint. In other languages, the city is sometimes called Izlataltıs (Ызлататыс), or Zılataus (Зылатаус) in Tatar, and Zalatauys (Залатауыс) in Bashkir.

== History ==
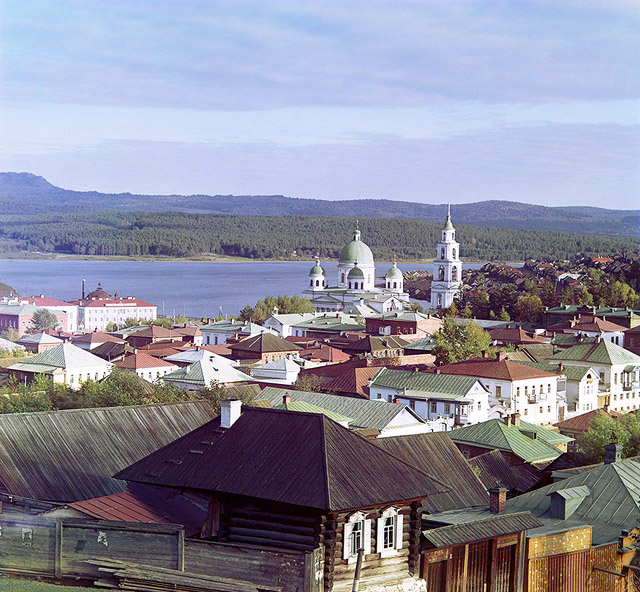
View of Zlatoust c. 1910. Photo by Sergey Prokudin-Gorsky.

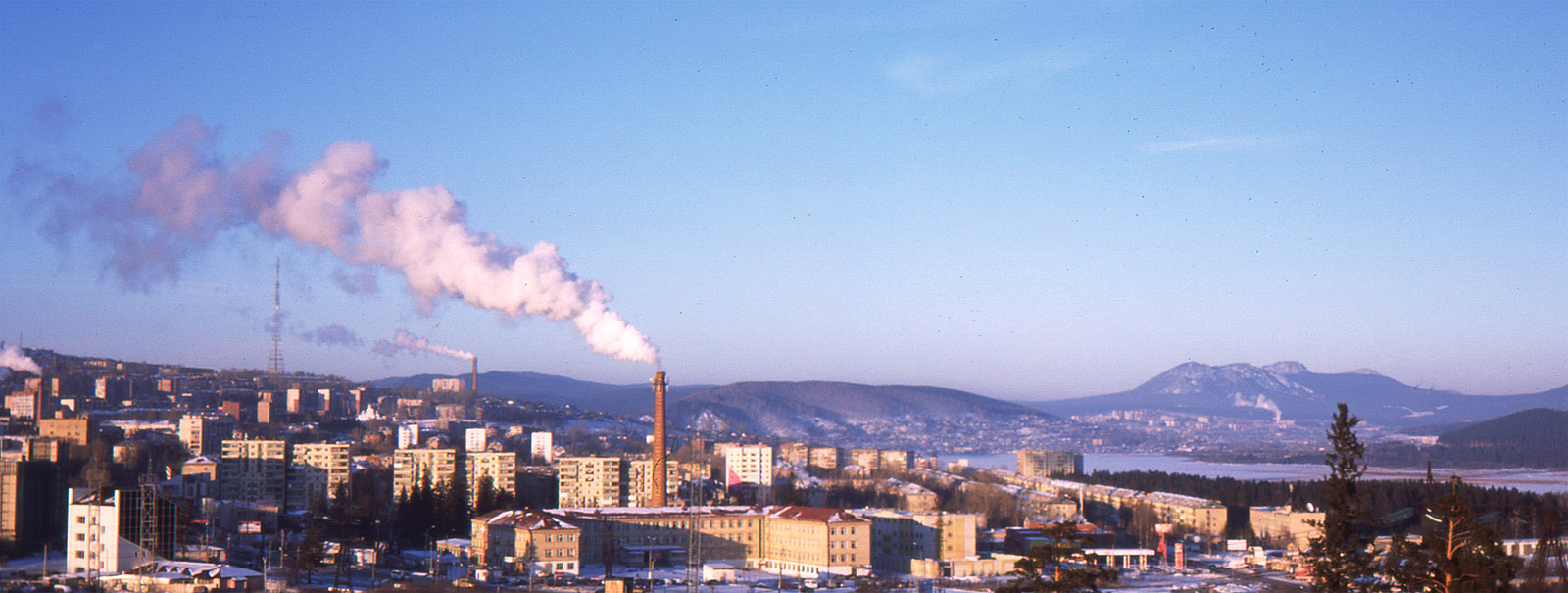
Panorama of Zlatoust c. 2011

Historical population
Year	Pop.	±%
1897	21,000	—
1926	48,000	+128.6%
1939	99,000	+106.2%
1959	161,342	+63.0%
1970	180,488	+11.9%
1979	197,760	+9.6%
1989	207,794	+5.1%
2002	194,551	−6.4%
2010	174,962	−10.1%
2021	161,774	−7.5%
Source: Census data

Zlatoust was founded in 1754 due to the construction of the ironworks. In 1774–76, the workers of the plant took part in the insurrection led by Yemelyan Pugachev. In the early 19th century, Pavel Anosov made the first Russian bulat steel blades in Zlatoust. It was granted town status in 1865. From 1865 to 1919 Zlatoust was part of Ufa Governorate. The town is also known for the first cannons made of Russian steel. In 1903, the Tsarist authorities brutally suppressed a strike, organized by the workers of Zlatoust.

In 1815, an arms factory was built here, which began to produce sabres and swords. To establish production, more than a hundred experts were invited from renowned arms centers in Europe, including Solingen and Klingenthal (Germany). In summer 1816, the first batch of Zlatoust blades was sent to Saint-Petersburg, both combat weapons and decorated samples. Famous artists Ivan Bushuyev and Ivan Boyarshinov authored unique patterns of cold-steel decorated with engravings. Bushuyev's and Boyarshinov's swords are very rare; under 2 dozen are believed to exist today, all in Russian state museums and wealthy Russians' collections (rare published example). The flying winged horse was a favorite element of many of Bushuyev's engravings, so he was given a nickname Ivan the Wingy (Ivanko Krylatko). Since then, a pegasus has been an emblem of the town. In the 1840s the engraving was shifted onto decorative metal plates. This idea was suggested by Zlatoust factory's director - Pavel Petrovich Anosov, who was taking care of factory's profit and decided to expand the product range. Since then Zlatoust engraving on household items and tableware became popular. The Soviets gained control over Zlatoust in March 1918. The town was occupied by the Whites between June 1918 and July 1919. On 13 July 1919, Zlatoust was seized by the Red Army.

During the Soviet period, Zlatoust became an industrial city, which specialized in metallurgy, mechanical engineering, tool-making, food production, and other industries. Zlatoust is one of the centers of artistic engraving on metal in Russia. Traditionally, such engravings were done on weapons, such as knives, swords and tableware. Zlatoust engraving on metal received an impulse to a new development, when in the 1960s young graduates of art Zlatoust schools started to work at the factory and reveal their talents.

== Administrative and municipal status ==
Within the framework of administrative divisions, it is, together with nine rural localities, incorporated as the City of Zlatoust—an administrative unit with the status equal to that of the districts. As a municipal division, the City of Zlatoust is incorporated as Zlatoustovsky Urban Okrug.

== Geography ==
=== Climate ===
Climate data for Zlatoust (1991-2020, extremes 1834–present)
Month	Jan	Feb	Mar	Apr	May	Jun	Jul	Aug	Sep	Oct	Nov	Dec	Year
Record high °C (°F)	6.6 (43.9)	9.3 (48.7)	17.1 (62.8)	27.6 (81.7)	32.2 (90.0)	35.1 (95.2)	37.9 (100.2)	34.0 (93.2)	31.1 (88.0)	23.6 (74.5)	12.2 (54.0)	8.3 (46.9)	37.9 (100.2)
Mean daily maximum °C (°F)	−9.1 (15.6)	−6.7 (19.9)	−0.3 (31.5)	8.6 (47.5)	16.8 (62.2)	20.8 (69.4)	22.3 (72.1)	19.9 (67.8)	13.8 (56.8)	6.0 (42.8)	−2.8 (27.0)	−8.0 (17.6)	6.8 (44.2)
Daily mean °C (°F)	−12.8 (9.0)	−11.5 (11.3)	−5.2 (22.6)	3.3 (37.9)	10.7 (51.3)	15.1 (59.2)	16.9 (62.4)	14.7 (58.5)	9.0 (48.2)	2.3 (36.1)	−6.0 (21.2)	−11.3 (11.7)	2.1 (35.8)
Mean daily minimum °C (°F)	−16.2 (2.8)	−15.4 (4.3)	−9.4 (15.1)	−1.4 (29.5)	4.9 (40.8)	9.8 (49.6)	12.0 (53.6)	10.5 (50.9)	5.2 (41.4)	−0.5 (31.1)	−8.6 (16.5)	−14.3 (6.3)	−1.9 (28.5)
Record low °C (°F)	−44.0 (−47.2)	−40.5 (−40.9)	−37.9 (−36.2)	−25.7 (−14.3)	−12.1 (10.2)	−2.8 (27.0)	1.5 (34.7)	−1.2 (29.8)	−7.9 (17.8)	−22.2 (−8.0)	−40.1 (−40.2)	−42.5 (−44.5)	−44.0 (−47.2)
Average precipitation mm (inches)	31 (1.2)	25 (1.0)	34 (1.3)	38 (1.5)	61 (2.4)	80 (3.1)	108 (4.3)	90 (3.5)	63 (2.5)	66 (2.6)	46 (1.8)	38 (1.5)	680 (26.7)
Average precipitation days	18.4	14.5	14.9	11.6	14.0	15.8	17.1	16.0	16.0	18.2	17.7	18.1	192.3
Mean monthly sunshine hours	53	99	153	185	239	252	238	190	129	81	50	37	1,706
Source 1: Pogoda.ru.net
Source 2: climatebase.ru (precipitation days, sun 1936-2012)

== Notable people ==
- Boris Shaposhnikov, Marshal of the Soviet Union
- Lidiya Skoblikova, Olympic and World Championship winning speed-skater
- Anatoly Karpov, former world chess champion
- Svetlana Ishmouratova, 2006 Olympic Gold Medalist biathlete
- Alexander Mordukhovich, composer
- Yuri Mikhailovich Vyshinsky, filmmaker and screenwriter
- Alyona Shvets, pop singer
