= Pavel Petrovich Anosov =

Russian mining engineer (1796–1851)

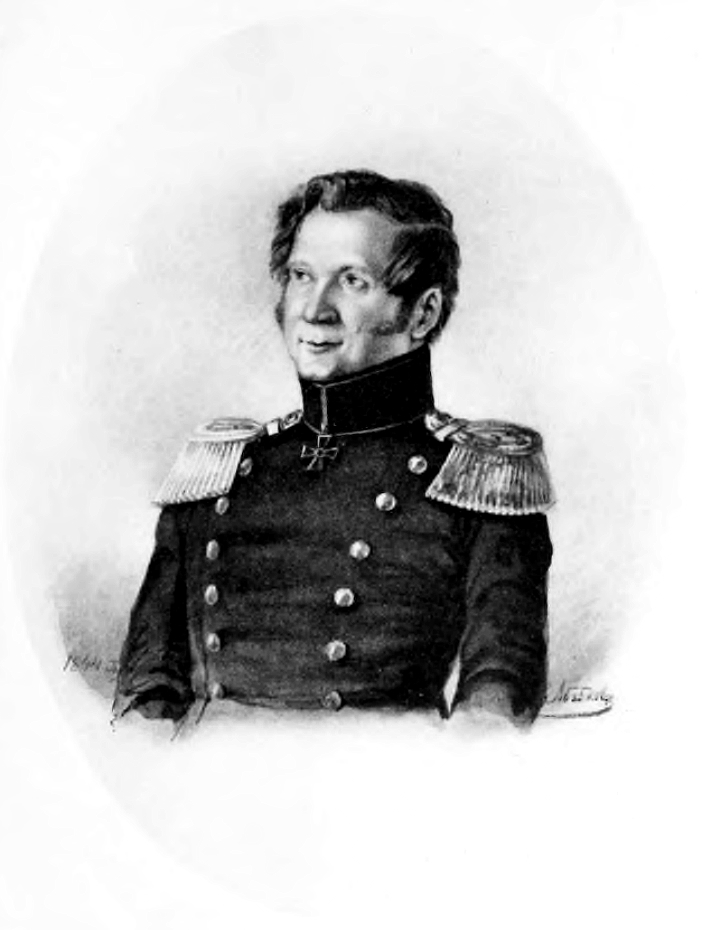
Pavel Anosov, 1844

Pavel Petrovich Anosov (Note: In this name that follows East Slavic naming customs, the patronymic is Petrovich and the family name is Anosov.) (Russian: Аносов Павел Петрович) (10 July 1796 (Old Calendar, 29 June), Tver — 25 May 1851 (Old Calendar, 13 May) was a Russian mining engineer, a metallurgical scientist, a major organizer of the mining industry, a researcher of the nature of the Southern Ural, governor of Tomsk and a General-Major.

== Early life ==
Anosov was the son of a petty clerk, and became an orphan at 13 years old. When his father died he left four young children as orphans: two older brothers, Peter and Pavel, and two younger sisters. The orphans took over the education of their maternal grandfather, mining official Sabakin Lev Fedorovich who was a mechanic in the Kama plants in Izhevsk and Votkinsk.

The grandfather sent Pavel with his elder brother Peter to the St. Petersburg Mining Cadet Corps in 1810, during which time his brother Peter died. Pavel Anosov's skill at mathematics and science led him to early success.

In 1817 he completed his Mining corps (Mountain corps) training, and joined the state factories at Zlatoust as a trainee. He took care of his younger sisters, the youngest of whom was soon married. The other remained a spinster at the time of Paul Anosov's death, and remained gravely unwell at their home.

== Career ==
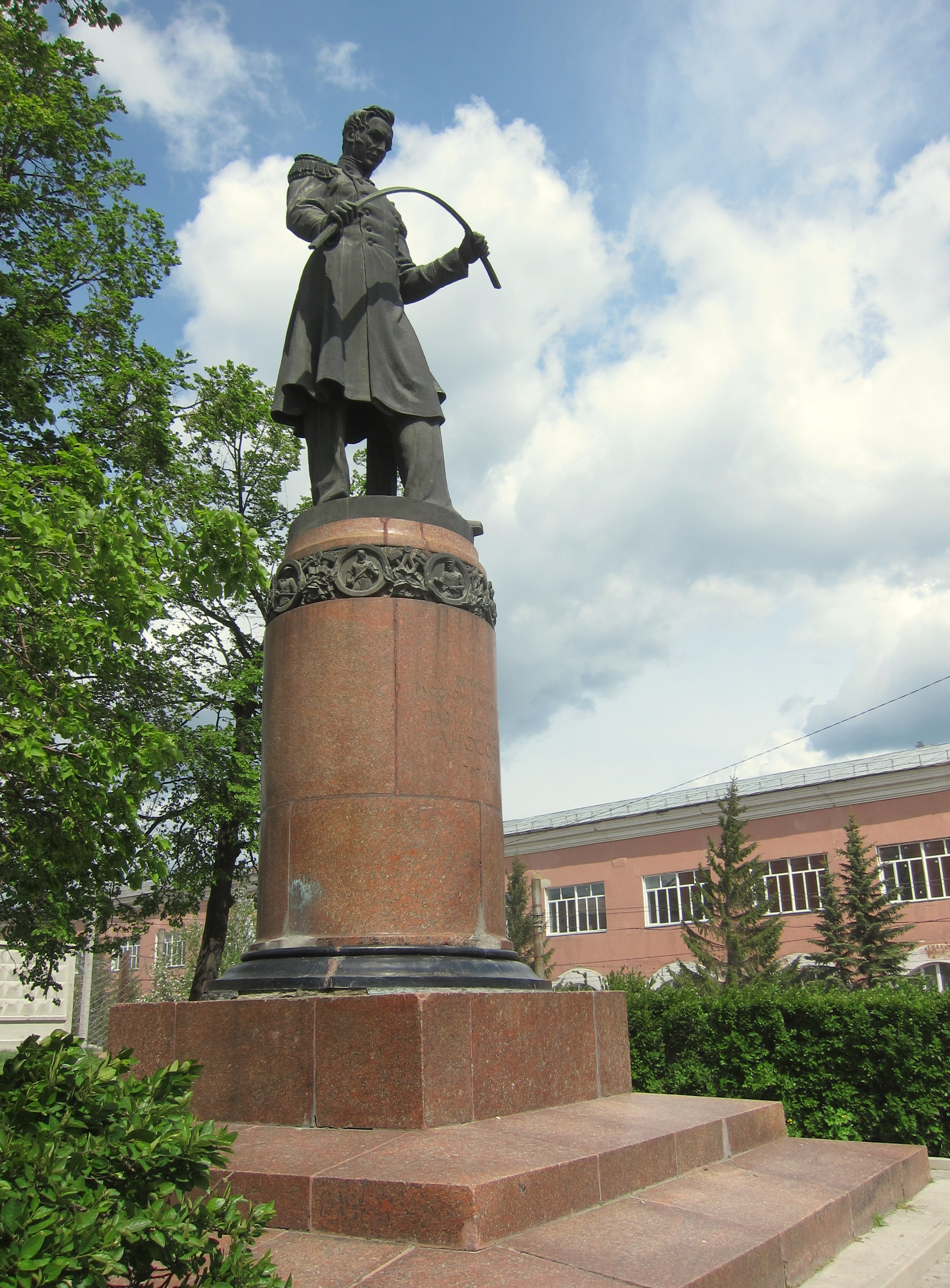
Statue in honor P.P. Anosov was erected in Zlatoust, Urals Military District, by Moscow sculptors A.P. Antropov and N.L. Strain and architect T.L. Shulgina on the 15 of December, 1954.

After completion of the corps he worked in Zlatoust Mining District from 1817 to 1847:

- 1817–1819 – as a trainee;
- 1819–1821 – as a caretaker of "decorated department" at the Arms factory;
- 1821–1824 – as an assistant of the arms factory steward;
- 1824–1831 – as the controller of the arms factory;
- 1831–1847 – as the head of mining and director of the arms factory;
- 1847–1851 – as the head of the Altai Mountains plants, and civilian governor of Tomsk.

His civil ranks in the Russian Empire had military rank equivalents, and Anosov was promoted from a trainee (equivalent to lieutenant in military rank) to Governor (equivalent to General) in twenty years.

Anosov received international attention for his writings on the manufacture of iron and his re-discovery of the secret of Damascene steel, previously thought lost in the Middle Ages. He explained the effect of the chemical composition, structure and treatment of steel on its properties. His findings formed the basis for the science of quality steels. Anosov summed up his studies in his now classic treatise, Damascene steels (1841), which was immediately translated into German and French.

Anosov was the first to use the microscope in studies into the structure of steel (1831), laying the foundation for the microscopic analysis of metals.

Anosov was elected a corresponding member of Kazan University in 1844, and an honorary member of Kharkov University in 1846.

== See also ==
- Statue of Graf Vorontsov, Odessa
- Statue of Metallurgist Anosov, Zlatoust
- Statue of Yuriy Dolgorukiy, Moscow#The satellite-monuments
- SS Metallurg Anosov
