= Bulat steel =

Steel alloy known in Russia from medieval times

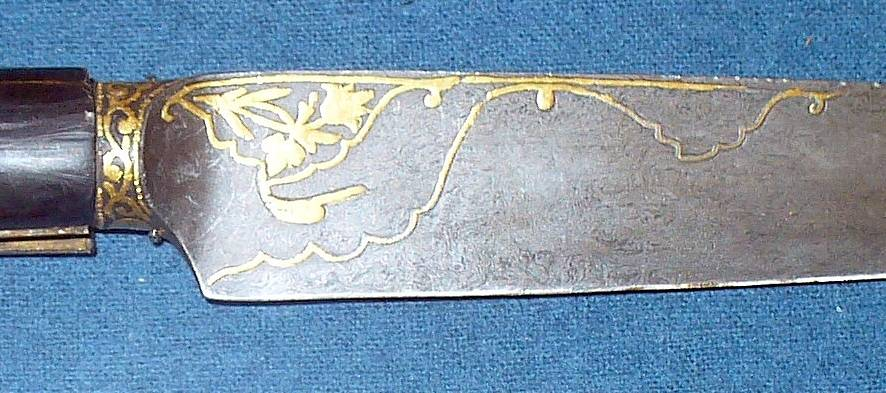
Detail of a wootz steel knife, 19th century, Persia. Wootz is likely the Indo-Arabic term for the same material.

Bulat is a type of steel alloy known in Russia from medieval times; it was regularly mentioned in Russian legends as the material of choice for cold steel. The name булат is a Russian transliteration of the Persian word fulad, meaning "steel". This type of steel was used by the armies of nomadic peoples. Bulat steel was the main type of steel used for swords in the armies of Genghis Khan. Bulat steel is generally agreed to be a Russian name for wootz steel, the production method of which has been lost for centuries, and the bulat steel used today makes use of a more recently developed technique.

== History ==
The secret of bulat manufacturing had been lost by the beginning of the 19th century. It is known that the process involved dipping the finished weapon into a vat containing a special liquid of which spiny restharrow extract was a part (the plant's name in Russian, stalnik, reflects its historical role), then holding the sword aloft while galloping on a horse, allowing it to dry and harden against the wind.

Pavel Anosov eventually managed to duplicate the qualities of that metal in 1838, when he completed ten years of study into the nature of Damascus steel swords.

Anosov had entered the Saint Petersburg Mine Cadet School in 1810, where a Damascus steel sword was stored in a display case. He became enchanted with the sword, and was filled with stories of them slashing through their European counterparts. In November 1817, he was sent to the factories of Zlatoust mining region in the southern Urals, where he was soon promoted to the inspector of the "weapon decoration department".

Here he again came into contact with Damascus steel of European origin (which was in fact pattern welded steel, and not at all similar), but quickly found that this steel was quite inferior to the original forged in the Middle East from wootz steel from India. Anosov had been working with various quenching techniques, and decided to attempt to duplicate Damascus steel with quenching. He eventually developed a methodology that greatly increased the hardness of his steels.

Bulat became popular in cannon manufacturing, until the Bessemer process was able to make the same quality steels for far less money.

== Structure ==
Carbon steel consists of two components: pure iron, in the form of ferrite, and cementite or iron carbide, a compound of iron and carbon. Cementite is very hard and brittle; its hardness is about 640 by the Brinell hardness test, whereas ferrite is only 200. The amount of the carbon and the cooling regimen determine the crystalline and chemical composition of the final steel. In bulat, the slow cooling process allowed the cementite to precipitate as micro particles in between ferrite crystals and arrange in random patterns. The color of the carbide is dark while steel is grey. This mixture is what leads to the famous patterning of Damascus steel.

Cementite is essentially a ceramic, which accounts for the sharpness of Damascus (and bulat) steel. Cementite is unstable and breaks down between 600 and 1100 °C into ferrite and carbon, so working the hot metal must be done very carefully.

== See also ==
- Toledo steel
- Damascus steel
- Wootz steel
- Noric steel
- Tamahagane steel

== Bibliography ==
- Verhoeven, J. D. (January 2001). "The Mystery of Damascus Blades". Scientific American. 284 (1): 74–79. Bibcode:2001SciAm.284a..74V. doi:10.1038/scientificamerican0101-74. JSTOR 26059015. PMID 11132427.
- Smith, Cyril S. (1988). History of Metallography: The Development of Ideas on the Structure of Metals before 1890. MIT Press. ISBN 0262691205.
- Figiel, Leo S. (1991). On Damascus Steel. Atlantis Arts Press. ISBN 978-0-9628711-0-8.
- Verhoeven, J.D.; Pendray, A.H.; Dauksch, W.E. (September 1998). "The key role of impurities in ancient damascus steel blades". Journal of Metallurgy. 50 (9): 58–64. Bibcode:1998JOM....50i..58V. doi:10.1007/s11837-998-0419-y. S2CID 135854276.
- Verhoeven, J.D. (2007). "Pattern Formation in Wootz Damascus Steel Swords and Blades" (PDF). Indian Journal of History of Science. 42 (4): 559–574.
