= Statue of Graf Vorontsov, Odesa =

Statue in Odesa, Ukraine

Coordinates: 46.4841°N 30.7316°E

Statue of Graf Vorontsov in Odesa
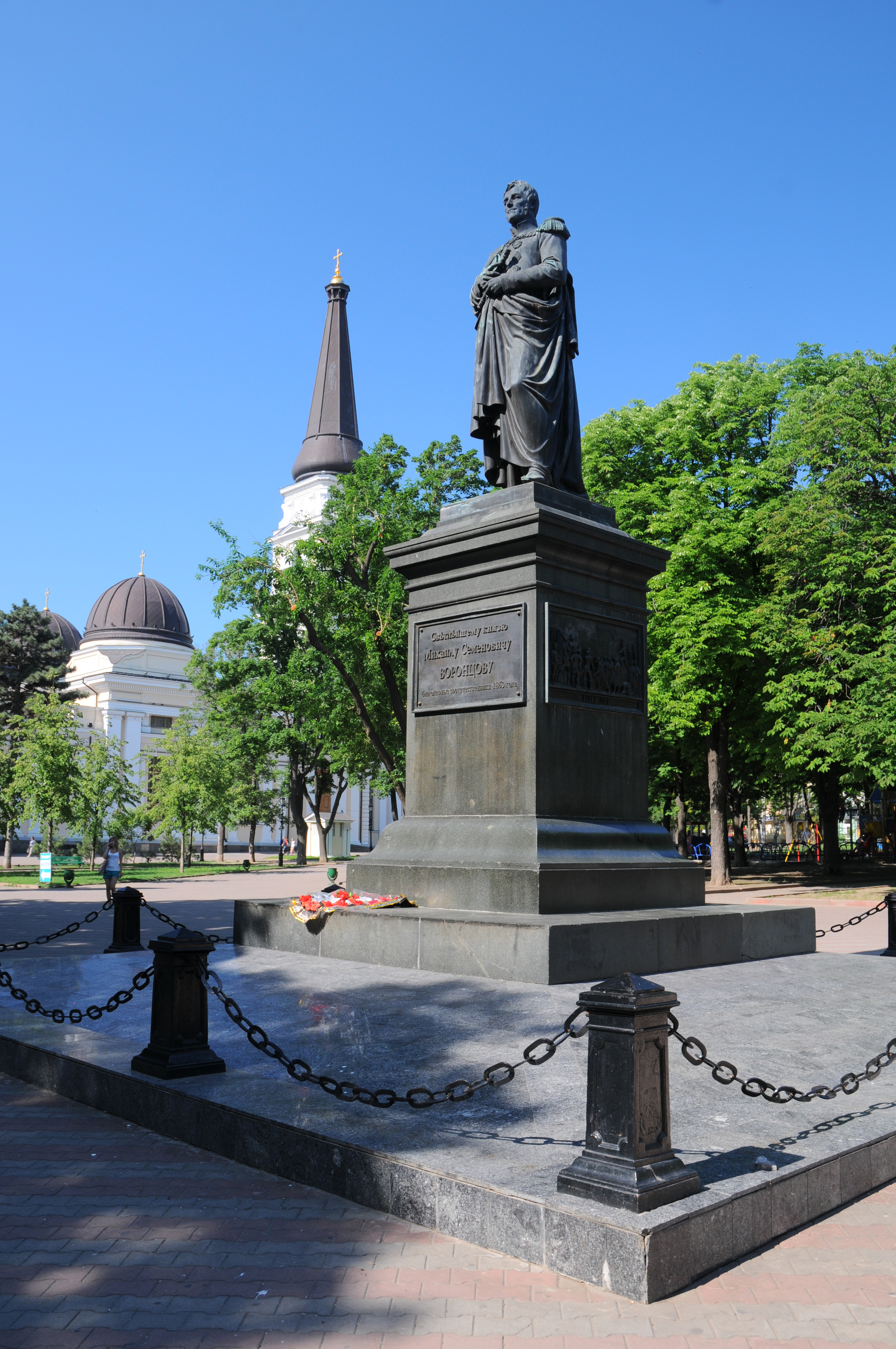
- The statue of Knyaz Mikhail Semyonovich Vorontsov on Sobor Square in Odesa in June, 2012
- Artist: Sculptor Friedrich Brugger (sculpture, bas-reliefs); Merchant Telyatnikov P.A. (pedestal); Architect Francesco Carlo Boffo
- Year: 1863
- Type: Bronze sculpture
- Location: Sobor Square, Odesa

The Statue of Graf Vorontsov, Odessa, is a sculptural and former monument established in 1863 on the Sobor Square in Odesa in honor of Mikhail Semyonovich Vorontsov, Field Marshal, the General-Governor of Novorossiya Region and plenipotentiary governor of Bessarabia who was a graf until 1845, then knyaz from 1845. The sculptor is Friedrich Brugger, the pedestal was made under the command of Sevastopol 1st guild merchant P.A. Telyatnikov. and the architect was Francesco Carlo Boffo. On 11 November 2023 the monumental status of the sculpture was scrapped.

It was the second monument in Odesa after the Statue of the Duke of Richelieu.

The statue has also been known as the statue of Vorontsov, the statue of Graf Vorontsov or the statue of Knyaz Vorontsov.

== Creation ==
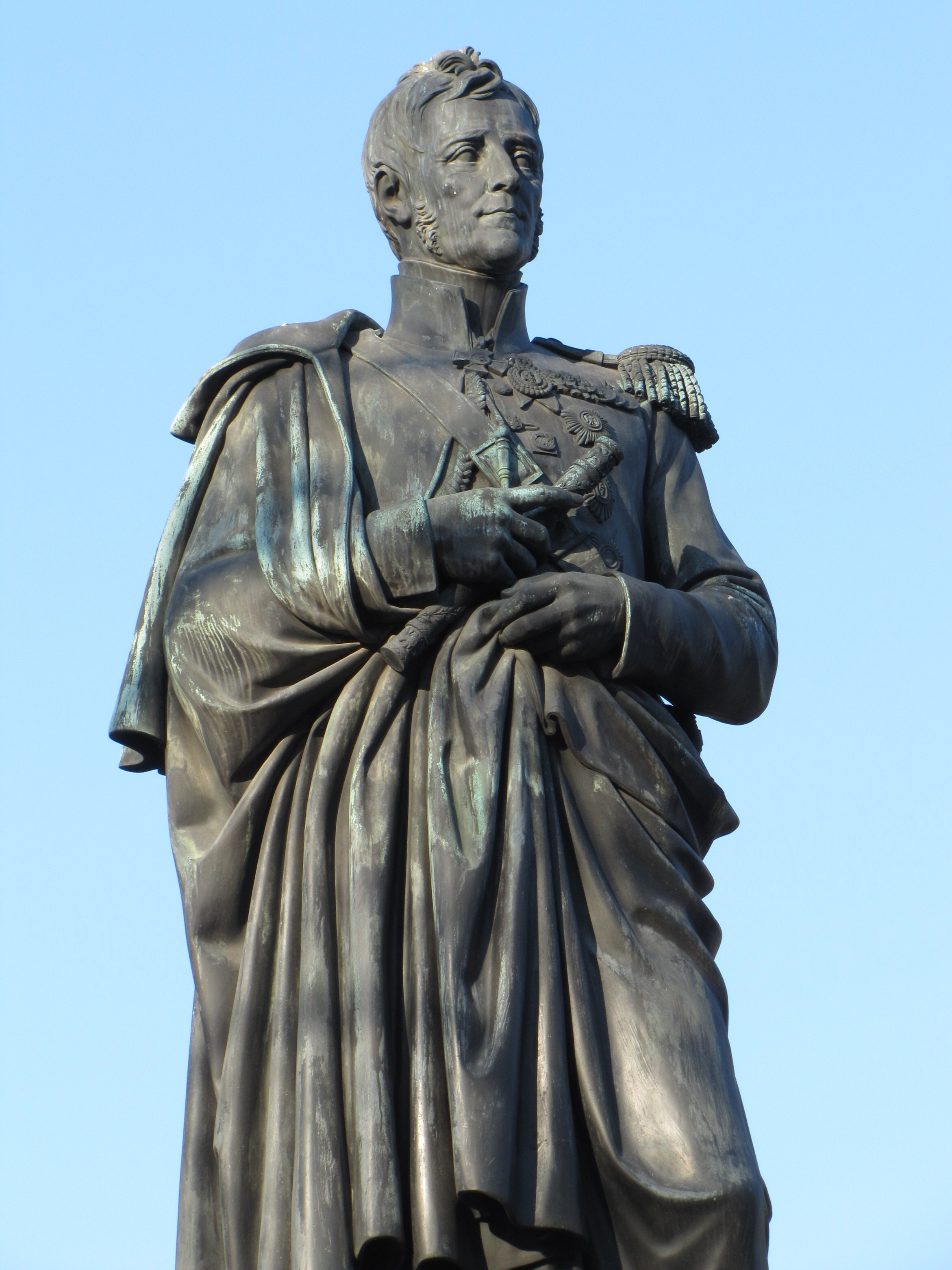
Striking resemblance to the departed Knyaz Vorontsov

Graf Mikhail Semyonovich Vorontsov died on November 6, 1856, and buried in Odesa Cathedral. Soon after his death, the "Society of Agriculture of South Russia" whose president he was, unanimously adopted a proposal to erect a monument to him. The Society appealed to Alexander II of Russia for permission to start collecting of money via subscription for the construction of a monument.The highest permission was granted, and a subscription inside the whole empire was successful.

The vice-president of the Society, Graf M.D. Tolstoy was elected as the Chairman of the Committee for the collection of offerings, and he became the first and most generous contributor. Emperor Alexander II donated 3000 silver rubles, many citizens of Odesa contributed in the first days of the opening. Donations came from both Russians and foreigners.

The sculpture was by German Friedrich Brugger (1815–1870). Implementation of all the bronze works, the statue of Vorontsov and the bas-reliefs, were committed via the Russian envoy in Munich, Privy Councillor Severin to the author of the project with the payment of 32,000 Bavarian guldens including delivery to Trieste or Vienna.

The likeness was achieved as the sculptor was able to take advantage of the last portrait of Mikhail Semyonovich Vorontsov by the Berlin master of portraiture Franz Krüger (1797–1857).

As per request of the Committee, the pedestal was made from "mountain-boulders" from the southern coast of Crimea. The Sevastopol I-st guild merchant P.A. Telyatnikov took over the making of the pedestal. According to his estimates the pedestal, including delivery, should have cost 12,000–13,000 rubles. However, the prepared stone boulders drowned in the sea despite the precautions taken. The estimated loss was more than 7000 rubles, but Telyatnikov added 3000 rubles from his own pocket.

Eleven stone blocks, the smaller of which weighed more than 200 pounds, were mined near Ayu-Dag for the plinth, cornice, and the middle of the monument's pedestal. The mountain "was torn by gunpowder" in one and a half versts from the Black Sea coast. The stone blocks were dragged through rocks and ravines—which workers had to fill with stones and cut trees—to load onto the ship. It was impossible to use horses or bulls in these conditions. For three months, about 70 people were involved in works every day. There were days when a stone block overcame only one sazhen (sazhen (2.13 metres) during the day. And a new obstacle was waiting on the shore: the precipice in height of 4 sazhens, which was extended by shallow and this shallow did not allow the ship to approach the shore. It was necessary to build a bridge, which was completed and had length of 20 sazhens. The swell at sea also raised difficulties and only during some hours per day, during the calm weather, was possible to carry out works.

On the way to Odesa the ship was towed by the steamship Alexander, employed by the Society of Shipping and Trade. Despite strong winds increasing the loss of stability due to bigger stones being placed on the deck due to the inability to load them into the hold, the blocks arrived safely. On arrival in Odesa the stone blocks were moved via oak rollers, which were placed under the huge stone blocks to the monument site.

According to the expenses report of the Committee all summary offerings collected were 45,072 rubles 12 kopecks, including 13,134 rubles 50 kopecks in Odesa. The sculptor Friedrich Brugger received 21,125 rubles 18 kopecks, the pedestal's stones cost 15,000 rubles, and the finishing of the pedestal cost 5,097 rubles 23 kopecks.

== Opening ceremony ==
The opening of the monument took place on November 8, 1863. Local newspaper Одесский вестник (Odesa herald) wrote:

On the 8 of November, the day of St. Michael, Odesa celebrated the opening of a monument of His Serene Highness Knyaz Mikhail Semenovich Vorontsov. In the morning of this day the vast Sobor Square, where the monument to the departed Knyaz was erected after seven years from the day of his death, was filled with dense crowd total up to 20,000 souls. All parts of the Square, all surrounding streets, all windows, balconies and roofs of the houses were dappled with people. An extensive temporary platform for the audience was constructed at the house of Mr. Mimi, directly opposite the Cathedral. About noon, after the Divine Liturgy which was carried out in the Cathedral be the Most Reverend Dimitriy, the Kherson and Odesa archbishop, the procession ... had moved from the Cathedral and took the marked for her places around the monument, which were arranged by 4 platform: for the clergy, for the Generalitat, for local and non-resident citizens.

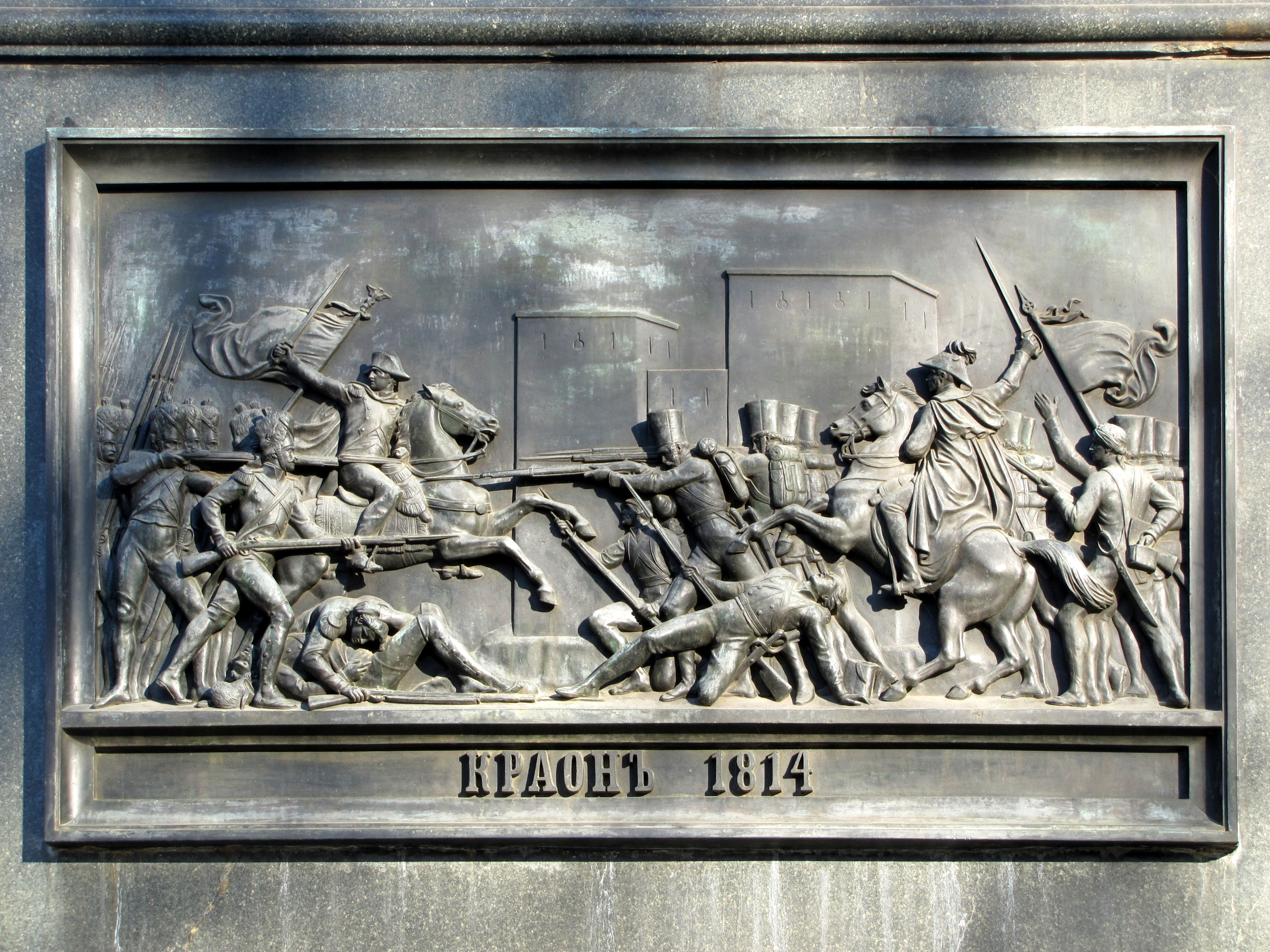
Bas-relief of Napoleonic war; Vorontsov leads the Russian troops to restrain the enemy onslaught.

During the ceremony following persons attended: Novorossiya and Bessarabia General-Governor and Commander of the Odesa Military District General-Adjutant Mr. Kotzebue, General-Adjutant Graf Stroganoff, Odesa provost, teachers of educational and charitable institutions, members of the nobility, the clergy, the deputation from different cities, from the German and Bulgarian colonies, from Tatars, the patriarchs of the city, artisans who worked on the construction of the monument, the disabled, who served under the command of the departed Knyaz M.S. Vorontsov, army troops ... The following members of the House of Knyaz Vorontsov were Her Serene Highness Knyaginya E.K. Vorontsova and the son of Knyaz M.S. Vorontsov, His Serene Highness Knyaz S.M. Vorontsov".

The ritual of monument consecration was carried out by the church servants. During the ceremony solemn eulogies sounded and there were fireworks, ending with a troops parade. The monument quickly became a tourist attraction.

== Description ==
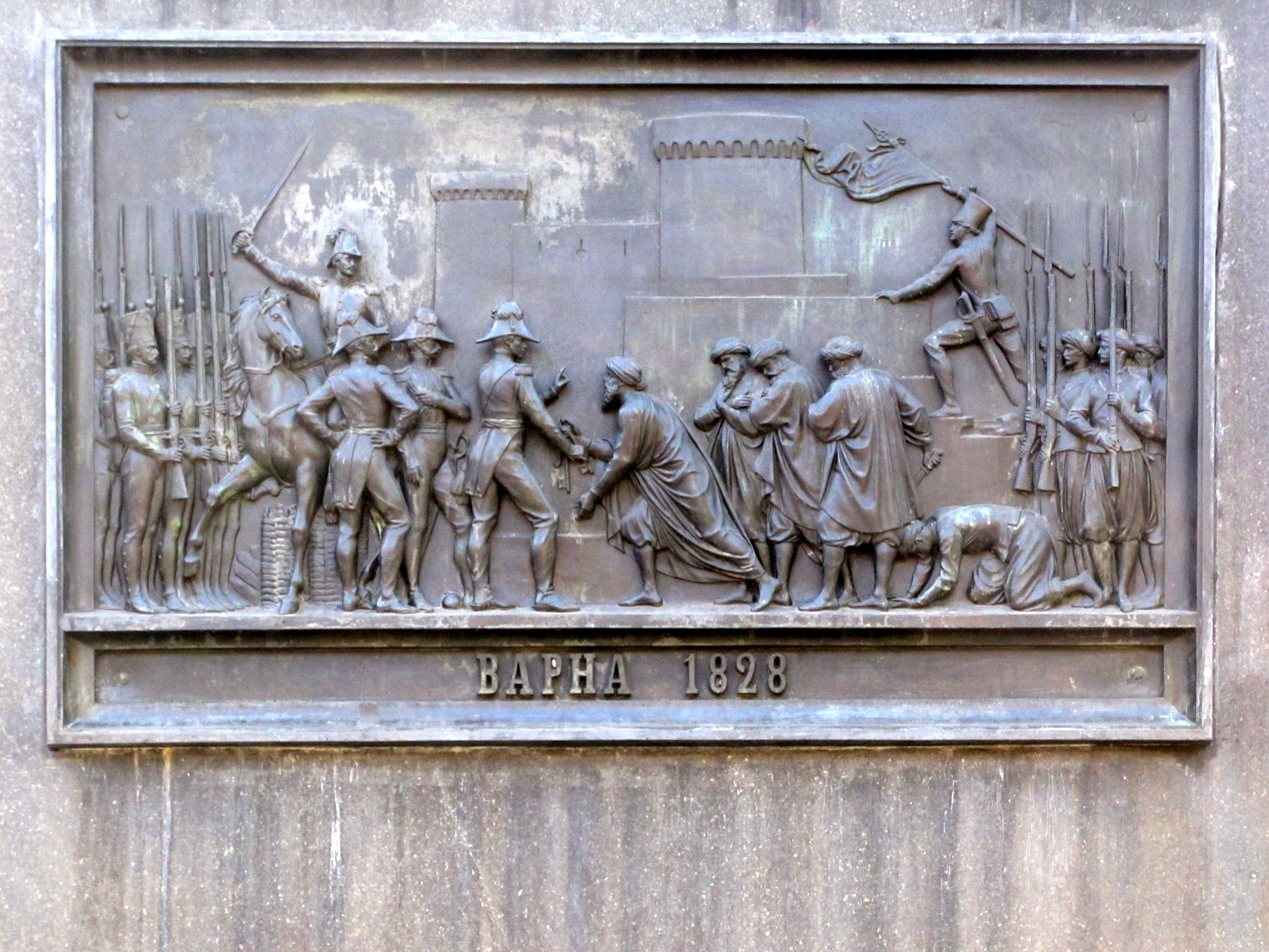
Bas-relief of the delivery of the Varna fortress keys from the enemy during the Russian-Turkish war.

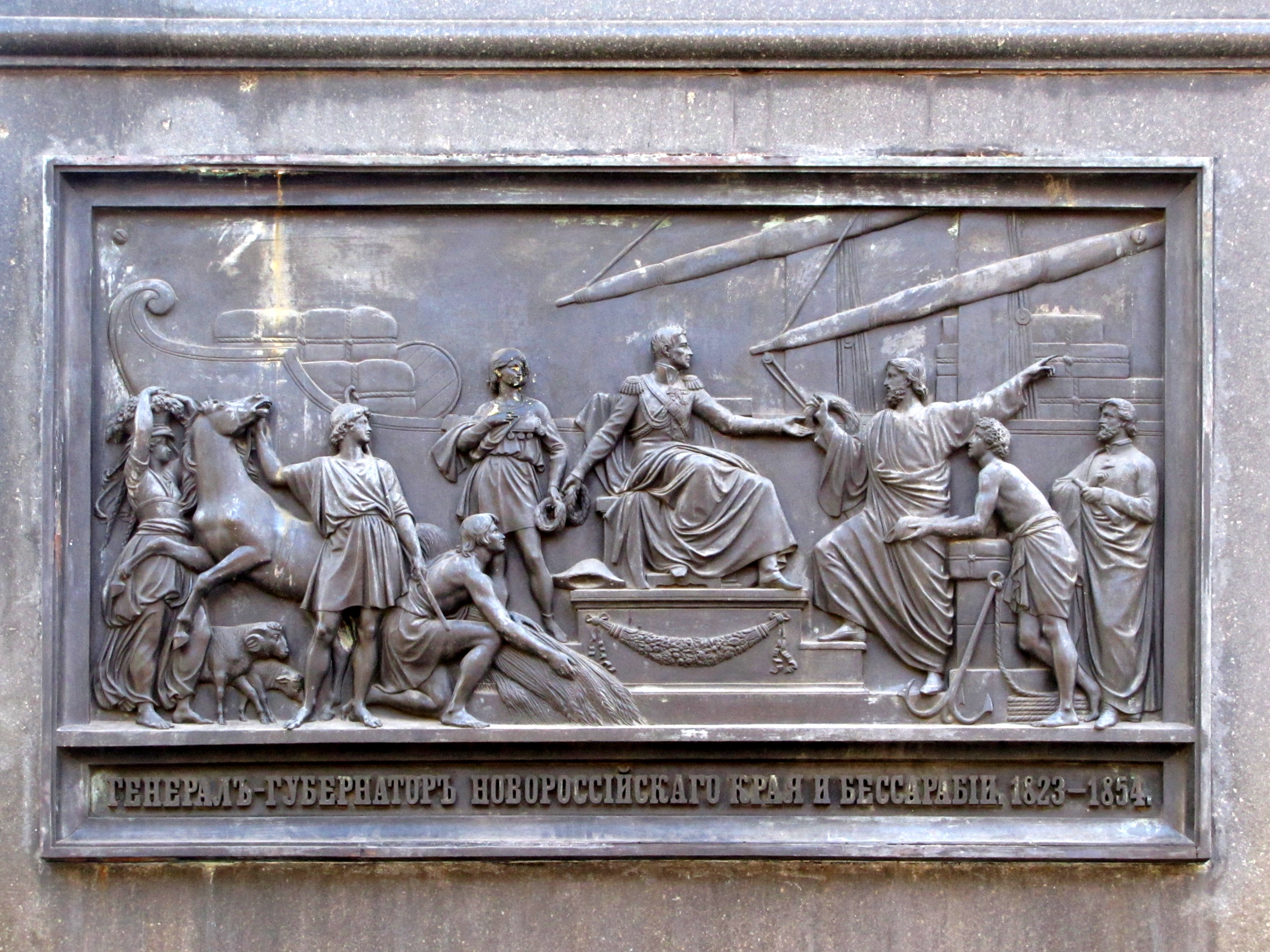
Bas-relief celebrating rapidly developing agriculture and trade during Vorontsov management in Odesa.

The statue mounted on the tetrahedral pedestal of polished and shiny dark green with whitish and blackish speckles Crimean diorite.

The height of bronze figure is 3.2 meters. The total height of the monument is more than 8 meters.

The sides were decorated with three bronze bas-reliefs commemorating scenes from the graf's history and an inscription was affixed to the front of the pedestal:

- The first scene has the inscription "Craonne in 1814" and is from the war in France, before the abdication of Napoleon, when Vorontsov led the Russian army troops in battle.
- the second scene has the inscription "Varna in 1828" and celebrates the hand over of the keys to Varna during the Russian-Turkish war. Mikhail Semyonovich Vorontsov is in the center.
- The third scene is inscribed "For the General-Governor of Novorossiya Region and Bessarabia, 1823-1854" and pictures the abundance of agriculture and trade during the Vorontsov period in Odesa.
- The dedication plaque reads "To His Serene Highness Prince Mikhail Semyonovich Vorontsov from grateful countrymen in 1863".

The fence of the monument consisted of 12 cast-iron pedestals decorated with coats of arms of the city and connected by chains. The arms of the city were chipped ruthlessly and savagely.

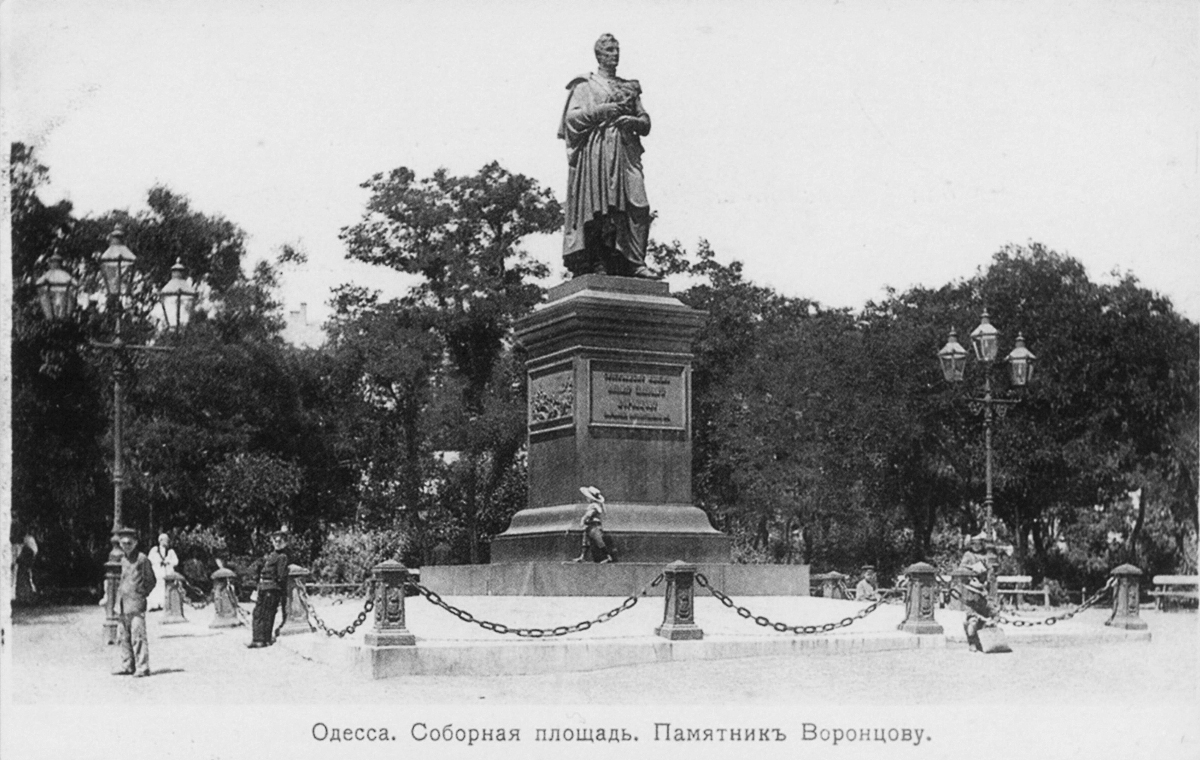
The statue of Knyaz Mikhail Semyonovich Vorontsov on Sobor Square in Odesa before 1914

== Formation of the Soviet Union ==
Around 1935 the Sobor Square was renamed The Square of the 10th anniversary of the Red Army. In the second part of the 1930s, the Soviet authorities tried to pull down the statue but the thick steel chain, which was secured around to the monument and to a powerful tractor, broke. Unable to destroy the statue, Odesa Agitprop had the dedication replaced by an unflattering verse by poet Alexandr Pushkin. The Graf and the poet were not friendly and Pushkin had expressed his feelings in a short poem.

Russian text of the verse	Translation on English
«Полумилорд, полукупец, Полумудрец, полуневежда, полуподлец, но есть надежда, Что будет полным наконец.»	«A semi-milord, a semi-negociant, A semi-sage, a semi-ignorant, A semi-scoundrel, but hope is present That finally he will one hundred percent.»

== World War II ==
At the start of World War II the anti-aircraft guns were installed in the Square, close to the monument, to protect Odesa from the bombing. The siege of Odesa (1941) lasted from 5 of August to 16 of October 1941, when the Soviets left the city and German troops entered the city.

After World War II the bronze statue of Stalin was erected in the Square on the 10th anniversary of the Red Army, side by side with the statue of Graf Vorontsov. A construction in the form of a miniature map of the Soviet Union including rivers and hydroelectric power plants was posted close to this statue.

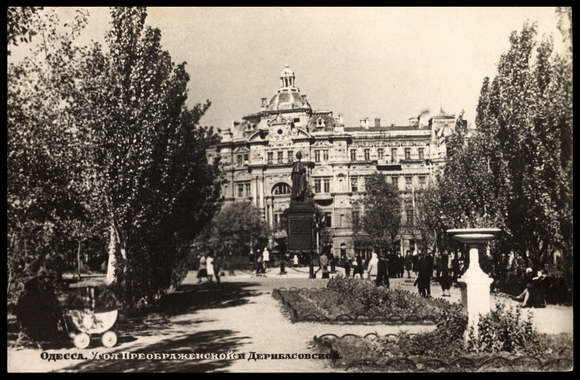
Postal Card: Odesa, House of Russov is behind the Statue of Vorontsov. View from one of the alleys of the Soviet Army Square. Circa 1960.

== After the dissolution of the Soviet Union ==
By December 31, 1991, the few remaining Soviet institutions that had not been taken over by Russia ceased operation, and individual republics assumed the central government's role, and the historical memories began to come back.

The original bas-reliefs and inscription were returned to the Statue of Knyaz Vorontsov. and Pushkins verse was removed.

In autumn 2005, the remains of the Knyaz Vorontsov family were returned to the newly rebuilt Cathedral on Sobor Square in Odesa. There was a fireworks display. Military troops marched beside the statue of Knyaz Vorontsov and saluted the General Field Marshal.

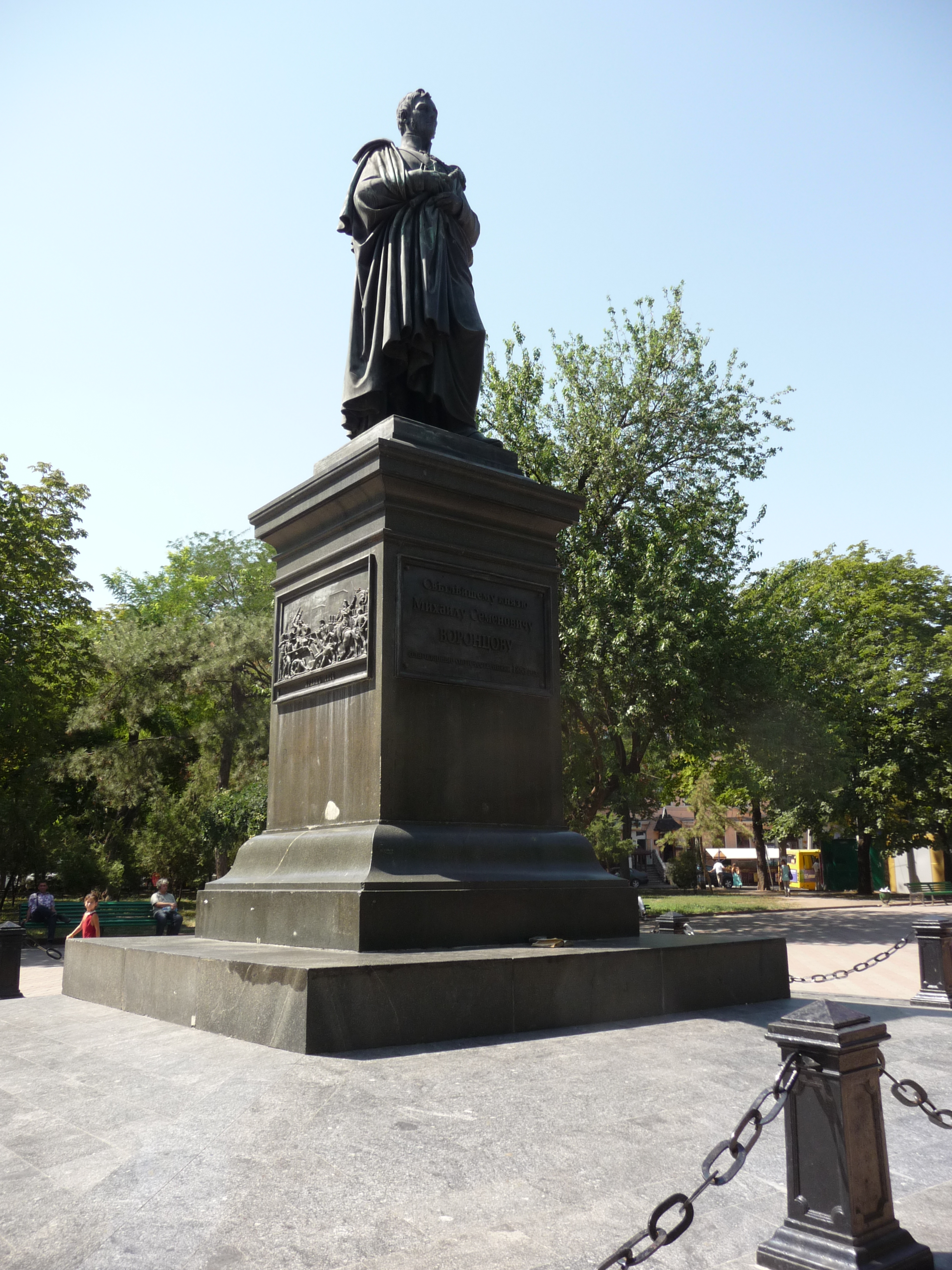
The statue of Graf Vorontsov on the Sobor Square in Odesa in 2012

The monument of M.S. Vorontsov on the Sobor Square was declared an object of cultural heritage. The monument was taken under the protection firstly as a monument to local history the decision of the Executive Committee of the Odesa Regional Council dated 27 of July, 1971, the number 381. The security number: 150006 - Н. Then as a monument to the monumental art of national importance, as a monument to urban planning and architecture of local importance according to the decision of the Executive Committee of the Odesa Regional Council dated 27 of December, 1991, the number 580; and finally as per Resolution of the Council of Ministers of Ukraine dated 3 of September, 2009, the State number 928.

But on 11 November 2023 the Cabinet of Ministers of Ukraine removed the statue from the register of monuments in order to comply with 2023 derussification-laws. This law prohibits toponymy that symbolizes or glorifies Russia, individuals who carried out aggression against Ukraine (or another country), as well as totalitarian policies and practices related to the Russian Empire and the Soviet Union, including Ukrainians living in Russian-occupied territories.
