= List of people considered father or mother of a field =

Often, discoveries and innovations are the work of multiple people, resulting from continual improvements over time. However, certain individuals are remembered for making significant contributions to the birth or development of a field or technology. These individuals may often be described as the "father" or "mother" of a particular field or invention.

== Fine art ==
Subject	Father/mother	Reason
Cowboy sculpture	Frederic Remington	Created first bronze cowboy sculpture in 1895
Japanese Manga (comics) and Anime (animation)	Osamu Tezuka	Creator of Manga (Japanese comics) and Anime (Japanese Animation)

== Games ==
Subject	Father/mother	Reason
Collectible card game	Richard Garfield	Creator of Magic: The Gathering
Miniature wargaming	H. G. Wells	Publication of Little Wars
Modern video game	Ralph H. Baer; Nolan Bushnell	Magnavox Odyssey, Pong
Role-playing game	Gary Gygax Dave Arneson	Creators of Dungeons & Dragons
Stealth game	Hideo Kojima	Creator of the Metal Gear stealth-action games
Video game	Thomas T. Goldsmith Jr.	Inventor of the first video game (Note: According to some definitions of "video game")
Video game industry	Ralph H. Baer Nolan Bushnell	Creator of the Magnavox Odyssey; inventor of the first home video game console Founder of Atari, co developer of Computer Space, the first widely available arcade video game.
Wargaming	Charles S. Roberts	Designer of Tactics

== Military ==
Subject	Father/mother	Reason
Atomic bomb	Enrico Fermi; Robert Oppenheimer; Leó Szilárd	
Blitzkrieg	Heinz Guderian	
Hydrogen bomb	Edward Teller	Member of the Manhattan Project in the 1940s
Atomic submarine and "nuclear navy"	Hyman G. Rickover	
Fourth Generation Warfare	William S. Lind	
The Soviet Union's Hydrogen Bomb	Andrei Sakharov	
Tank	Ernest Swinton (British), Jean Baptiste Eugène Estienne (French)	The need for armored and armed tracked vehicles to break the stalemate of trench warfare in WWI was noticed early on in the war by Winston Churchill and the British Landship Committee with Ernest Swinton working on British development and Jean Baptiste Eugène Estienne credited for coming up with the French version

== Technology ==
=== Fields ===
Subject	Father/mother	Reason
Aerodynamics (modern)	Sir George Cayley	Founding father of modern aerodynamics; first to identify the four aerodynamic forces of flight—weight, lift, drag, and thrust; modern airplane design is based on those discoveries
American manufacture	Samuel Slater	described by Andrew Jackson
American landscape architecture	Frederick Law Olmsted	Olmsted designed Central Park in New York City
Architecture	Imhotep	Built the first pyramid
Astronautics	Konstantin Tsiolkovsky; Sergei Korolev; Robert H. Goddard; Hermann Oberth	
Aviation	Father Francesco Lana-Terzi and Abbas ibn Firnas Ibn Firnas built the first human carrying glider and is reputed to have attempted two successful flights.	Wrote Prodromo alla Arte Maestra (1670); first to describe the geometry and physics of a flying vessel
Bionanotechnology	Carlo Montemagno	The development of biomolecular motors for powering inorganic nanodevices while at Cornell and muscle-driven self-assembled nanodevices while at UCLA.
British watchmaking	Thomas Tompion	
Clinical trials	James Lind	Conducted the first controlled clinical trial in the modern era of medicine, an investigation on using citrus food as a treatment for scurvy aboard HMS Salisbury in 1747
Computing	Charles Babbage	Inventor of the analytical engine, which was never constructed in his lifetime
Cybernetics	Norbert Wiener	
Gastrointestinal physiology	William Beaumont	
Genetics	Gregor Johann Mendel	Founder of genetics.
Green Revolution	Norman Borlaug	
Microscopy	Antonie van Leeuwenhoek	
Information theory	Claude Shannon	
Modern bladesmithing	William F. Moran	Founder of the American Bladesmith Society
Modern kinematics	Ferdinand Freudenstein	Applied digital computation to the kinematic synthesis of mechanisms
Modern Knifemaking	Bob Loveless	Founder of the Knifemakers' Guild
Nanotechnology	Richard Smalley	Nobel Prize Biography
Photography	Louis Daguerre; Nicéphore Niépce; William Henry Fox Talbot; Thomas Wedgwood	
Robotics	Ismail al-Jazari; Banū Mūsā brothers	Ismail al-Jazari Invented the first programmable humanoid robot in 1206; The Bānu Musā brothers invented an automatic flute which may have been the first programmable machine

=== Computing ===
Subject	Father/mother	Reason
C (programming language)	Dennis Ritchie	
Assembler	Nathaniel Rochester	
Concurrent computing/Concurrent programming	Edsger W. Dijkstra	In his 2004 memoir, "A Programmer's Story: The Life of a Computer Pioneer", Per Brinch Hansen wrote that he used "Cooperating Sequential Processes" to guide his work implementing multiprogramming on the RC 4000, and described it saying, "One of the great works in computer programming, this masterpiece laid the conceptual foundation for concurrent programming."
Compiler	John Backus	Credited as having introduced the first complete compiler in 1957, although rudimental compilers (linker) were created by Grace Hopper in 1952 and by J. Halcombe Laning and Neal Zerlier (Laning and Zierler system) in 1954.
Computer	Charles Babbage	The concepts he pioneered in his analytical engine later formed the basis of modern computers.
Computer	Alan Turing	Secret code breaker during WWII; invented the Turing machine (1936)
Computer	John V. Atanasoff	Invented the digital computer in the 1930s
Computer	Konrad Zuse	Invented world's first functional program-controlled computer
Computer	John von Neumann	Became "intrigued" with Turing's universal machine and later emphasised the importance of the stored-program concept for electronic computing (1945), including the possibility of allowing the machine to modify its own program in useful ways while running. John von Neumann is also considered to be the inventor of flowchart.
Computer	John W. Mauchly; J.Presper Eckert	Invented the ENIAC (Electronic Numerical Integrator And Computer) in 1946. ENIAC was the first general-purpose electronic computer capable of being reprogrammed to solve a full range of computing problems.
Computer program	Ada Lovelace	Recognized by historians as the writer of the world's first computer program which was for the Charles Babbage Analytical Engine, but was never completed.
Internet	Vint Cerf Bob Kahn	Developed the Internet Protocol (IP) and Transmission Control Protocol (TCP) during 1973–81, the two original protocols of the Internet protocol suite. There were many other Internet pioneers involved in the creation of the Internet.
Logo (programming language)	Seymour Papert	
Microprocessor	Federico Faggin Marcian Hoff Stanley Mazor; Masatoshi Shima	Designers of the first commercial microprocessor, the Intel 4004.
Packet switching	Paul Baran Donald Davies	Recognized by historians and the U.S. National Inventors Hall of Fame for independently inventing the concept of digital packet switching used in modern computer networking including the Internet. Baran published a series of briefings and papers about dividing information into "message blocks" and sending it over distributed networks between 1960 and 1964. Davies conceived of and named the concept of packet switching in data communication networks in 1965. Many of the wide-area packet-switched networks built in the 1970s were similar "in nearly all respects" to Davies' original 1965 design. Larry Roberts learned about Davies' and Baran's work at the inaugural Symposium on Operating Systems Principles in October 1967. He and Leonard Kleinrock subsequently worked on the ARPANET, but their claims to have originated the concept of packet switching are disputed by other Internet pioneers, including by Robert Taylor, Paul Baran, and Donald Davies.
Pentium microprocessor	Vinod Dham	The original Pentium (P5) was developed by a team of engineers, including John H. Crawford, chief architect of the original 386, and Donald Alpert, who managed the architectural team. Dror Avnon managed the design of the FPU. Dham was general manager of the P5 group. Some media sources have called him the "father of the Pentium".
Personal computer	Chuck Peddle	Developed the 6502 microprocessor, the KIM-1 and the Commodore PET
Personal computer	Henry Edward "Ed" Roberts; André Truong Trong Thi	
Programmable logic controller	Dick Morley	
Python (programming language)	Guido van Rossum	
Search engine	Alan Emtage	Created Archie, a pre-Web search engine which pioneered many of the techniques used by subsequent search engines
SGML	Charles Goldfarb	
Spreadsheet	Dan Bricklin	Invented the VisiCalc spreadsheet program, which was the killer application of the Apple II. VisiCalc is considered the first killer app in computer history.
Self-stabilization (Self-stabilizing distributed systems)	Edsger W. Dijkstra	
Structured programming	Edsger W. Dijkstra	
World Wide Web	Tim Berners-Lee	The Hypertext Transfer Protocol (HTTP).
Visual Basic	Alan Cooper	
XML	Jon Bosak	
Wi-Fi	Vic Hayes	

=== Inventions ===
Subject	Father/mother	Reason
AC induction motor	Nikola Tesla	Inventor of the AC induction motor, the foundation of the electric power grids worldwide for the transmission and distribution of electric power.
Airplane	Wright brothers	Invented the first successful powered fixed-wing aircraft, upon which further aircraft designs, methods of flight, and aircraft control systems were based.
Air conditioning	Willis Carrier	
Battery	Alessandro Volta	Invented the first electrical battery, the Voltaic pile.
Canning	Nicolas Appert	
Chronograph	George Graham	Referred so by Bernard Humbert of the Horology School of Bienne on his 1990 book The Chronograph as Graham was the first to construct a horological mechanism
Color photography	Sergey Prokudin-Gorsky	A Russian chemist and photographer. He is best known for his pioneering work in color photography of early 20th-century Russia.
Compact Disc	Kees Immink	
Compact Disc	Norio Ohga	This claim is disputed though he is credited for expanding its length to a widely accepted length of 90 minutes.
Ekranoplan	Rostislav Alexeev	Alexeyev revolutionised the shipbuilding industry (though in secrecy) by inventing craft that use ground effect, whereby a wing traveling close to the ground is provided with a better lift-drag ratio - thereby enabling a combination of greater aircraft weight for less power and/or enhanced fuel economy.
Electric generator	Michael Faraday	Discoverer of electromagnetism. Inventor of the Faraday disk, the first electric generator and the Faraday cage.
Modern firearms	John Moses Browning	Browning revolutionized the firearm industry with his automatic rifles that were manufactured by Winchester, Colt, Remington and Savage
Glow plug engine	Ray Arden	Invented the first glow plug for model engines
Go-karts	Art Ingels	Invented the motorized go-kart in 1956.
Helicopter	Igor Sikorsky	Invented the first successful helicopter, upon which further designs were based.
Instant noodle	Momofuku Ando	Inventor of the instant noodle, also founder of Nissin Foods to produce and market them.
Japanese television	Kenjiro Takayanagi	
Jet engine	Frank Whittle; Hans von Ohain	Von Ohain's design, an axial-flow engine, as opposed to Whittle's centrifugal flow engine, was eventually adopted by most manufacturers by the 1950s.
Karaoke	Daisuke Inoue	Inventor of the machine as a means of allowing people to sing without the need of a live back-up.
Laser	Charles Hard Townes	
Lightning prediction system	Alexander Stepanovich Popov	The first lightning prediction system, the Lightning detector, was invented in 1894 by Alexander Stepanovich Popov.
Marine chronometer	John Harrison	
Mobile phone	Martin Cooper	
Periodic table	Dmitri Mendeleev	Russian chemist, Dmitri Mendeleev, arranged the elements in an order that we would now recognise. He realised that the physical and chemical properties of elements were related to their atomic mass in a 'periodic' way, and arranged them so that groups of elements with similar properties fell into vertical columns in his table.
Plastics	Leo Baekeland	Baekeland was responsible for the creation of Bakelite, an early marketable plastic, in 1907.
Printing press	Johannes Gutenberg	Inventor of the movable type printing press, which led to a sharp worldwide increase in literacy, education and mass communication. It also led to the spread and sharing of knowledge.
Radio (radio communication)	Guglielmo Marconi	Developed the first form of radio wireless telegraphy
Radio (Radio broadcasting)	Reginald Fessenden; David Sarnoff	Fessenden is credited as the first to broadcast radio signals on Christmas Eve, 1906. Sarnoff proposed a chain of radio stations to Marconi's associates in 1915.
Radio (FM radio)	Edwin H. Armstrong	Obtained the first Federal Communications Commission (FCC) license to operate an FM station in Alpine, New Jersey at approximately 50 megahertz (1939)
Radiotelephony	Reginald Fessenden	
Spread spectrum	Paul Beard	Inventor of the spread spectrum, created Spektrum to promote its use.
Telephone	Johann Philipp Reis; Antonio Meucci; Alexander Graham Bell	See Invention of the telephone
Television	Paul Gottlieb Nipkow Philo T. Farnsworth Vladimir Zworykin John Logie Baird	Co-inventors of the electronic television, Farnsworth invented the Image dissector while Zworykin created the Iconoscope, both fully electronic forms of television. Logie Baird invented the world's first working television system, also the first electronic color television system. Fundamental to Baird's system was the Nipkow disk, invented by Paul Gotlieb Nipkow.
Tokamak	Lev Artsimovich	
Tube structure	Fazlur Rahman Khan	One of the greatest engineers of the 20th century. Invented the tube structural system and first employed it in his designs for the DeWitt-Chestnut Apartments, John Hancock Center and Sears Tower.
Video game console	Ralph H. Baer	Creator of the Magnavox Odyssey; inventor of the first video game console

== Transport ==
Subject	Father/mother	Reason
Automotive industry	Carl Benz	His Benz Patent Motorcar from 1885 is considered the first practical modern automobile and first car put into series production.
20th century American car industry	Henry Ford	Noted for introducing a simple and affordable car for the ordinary American masses.
American Interstate Highway System	Dwight D. Eisenhower	Proposed and signed the act which created the System.
Automatic transmission	Oscar Banker	
Bicycle industry	James Starley	Developed the differential gear and the bicycle chain.
Erie Canal	De Witt Clinton	
Electric traction	Frank J. Sprague	Developed electric elevator, electric railway and electric motor.
Flight simulator	Edwin Albert Link	Developed the Link Trainer.
Full-suspension mountain bike	Jon Whyte	Used his suspension design expertise at Benetton Formula to design the first full-suspension mountain bike for Marin Bikes.
Gasoline Automobile	Carl Benz	(Benz Patent-Motorwagen)
Gasoline Omnibus	Carl Benz	
Gasoline Motorcycle	Gottlieb Daimler/Wilhelm Maybach	(Daimler Reitwagen)
Gasoline Truck	Gottlieb Daimler (DMG Lastkraftwagen)/Carl Benz	
High-performance VW industry	Gene Berg	
Hot rod	Ed Winfield	
Import car culture	RJ DeVera	Influential for popularizing the import car scene in the mid-1990s.
Kustom Kulture	Von Dutch	
Maglev	Hermann Kemper, Eric Laithwaite	German engineer Hermann Kemper built a working model linear induction motor in 1935. In the late 1940s, professor Eric Laithwaite of Imperial College in London developed the first full-size working model, an important and necessary precursor to maglev trains.
Monster truck	Bob Chandler	Famed for building Bigfoot, which was the first to be capable of driving over cars and subsequently became one of the most famous monster truck in history.
Mountain bike	Gary Fisher	
Railways	George Stephenson	Pioneered rail transport, steam locomotives and invented standard-gauge railway track gauge.
Rock Crawling	Marlin Czajkowski	In 1994, Marlin made final drive ratios of 200:1 and lower possible in typical off-road vehicles (primarily Toyota Hilux trucks) and changed the way people access remote off-roading destinations.
Rotary engine	Felix Wankel	
Route 66	Cyrus Avery	
Tailfin	Harley Earl	
Tunneling (Modern)	Alan Muir Wood	Involved in the Channel Tunnel and Jubilee line extension.
Traffic safety	William Phelps Eno	
Trolleybus	Ernst Werner von Siemens	Built the Electromote in 1882.
Turbocharged engine	Paul Rosche	A lifetime employee of BMW, he evolutionized the turbocharged engine into automobile use. He also developed the first European turbocharged car, the racing 1969 BMW 2002 TiK that evolved into the production 1972 2002 Turbo.
Vehicular cycling	John Forester	Effective cycling founder
Yellow school bus	Frank W. Cyr	

== See also ==
- List of inventors
- List of pioneers in computer science
- Founders of statistics
- Father of the House
- Father (honorific)
