= Bob Kramer =

American bladesmith

- Born: 1957 or 1958 (age 67–68)
- Occupations: Knifemaker, Bladesmith
- Awards: American Bladesmith Society Master Bladesmith (1997); American Craft Council Rare Craft Fellowship Award (2015)
- Website: kramerknives.com

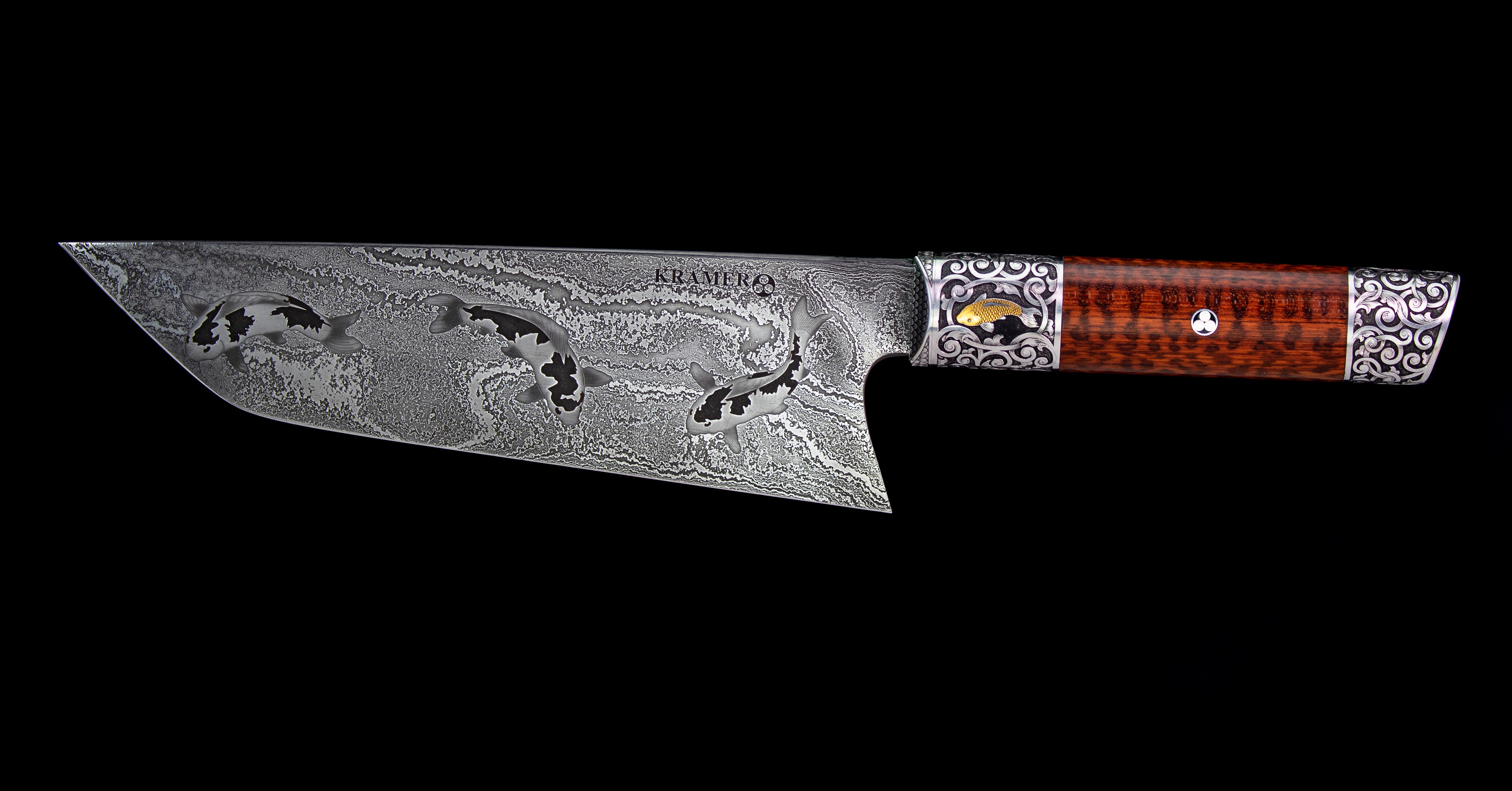
Custom made knife made personally by Bob Kramer in his shop in Bellingham, Washington. It was auctioned off in July 2019.

Bob Kramer (born 1958) is an American bladesmith, "widely considered the greatest American knifesmith working today". Some consider his kitchen knives to be "the best in the world". His first knife shop in Seattle, Bladesmiths, opened in 1993. As of 2017 he forges steel and makes knives in Bellingham, Washington.

== Education and early life ==
Kramer worked as a cook at Four Seasons Olympic Hotel in Seattle when he was an oceanography student at University of Washington. In 1992 he took a two-week course at American Bladesmith Society's school (ABS) in Hope, Arkansas (also reported as Washington, Arkansas) to become an apprentice knifemaker. He received the Master Bladesmith recognition from ABS in 1997.

== Knifemaking ==
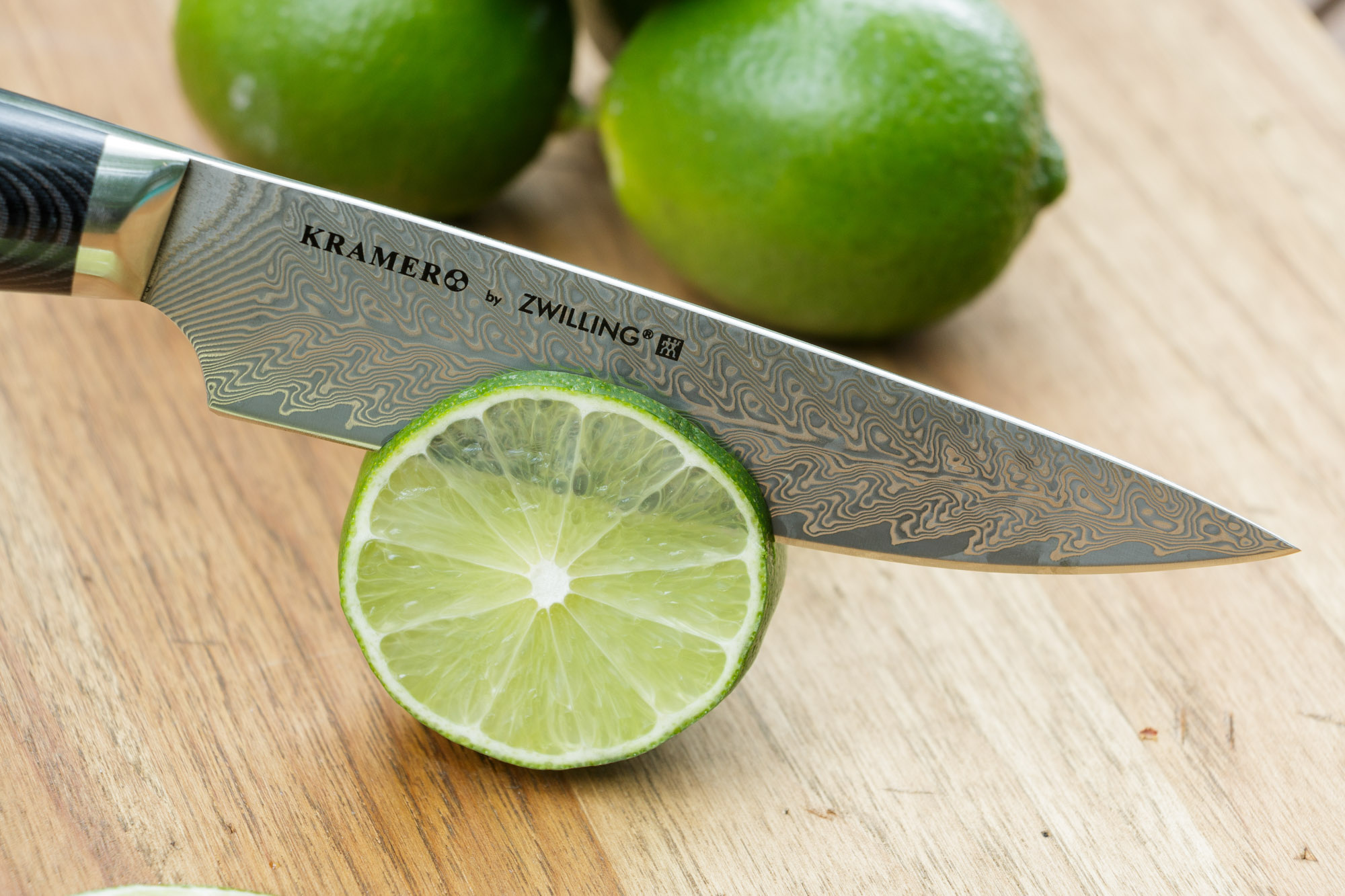
Kramer by Zwilling mass-produced knife

Kramer initially sold his knives in the conventional fashion: $150 for an 8-inch chef's knife in 1995, $125–$225 in 2000, $475 in 2008. After a 2008 article in Cook's Illustrated that deemed his 8-inch chef's knife to have "outperformed every knife we've ever rated" Kramer began selling by a waiting list. The knives are now sold by auction only. At auction a new handmade knife by Kramer cost $30,000 in 2015, as much as 100 knives mass-produced with similar materials to his specifications.

A handmade blade by Kramer was displayed as part of a juried art exhibition at Bellevue Arts Museum in 2016–2017. His knives are especially known for their fine Damascus steel patterns and exotic wood handles and "heirloom quality" polishing and finishing. Food personality Christopher Kimball has called a Kramer chef's knife his "most prized tool".

Kramer made a custom steel and meteorite knife for celebrity chef, Anthony Bourdain. The knife realized $231,250 including buyer's premium, at auction in October 2019.

=== Apprentices ===
Mareko Maumasi, also from the Olympia-Tumwater area, worked for Kramer in the 2010s and went on to become a noted independent knifemaker himself.

== Awards and media ==
Kramer appeared on Top Chef: Seattle as a judge in January 2013. He was named an American Craft Council Rare Craft Fellow in 2015.

== Personal life ==
Kramer lives in Bellingham, Washington, with his wife, Leanne.
