= James Black (blacksmith) =

American knifemaker and blacksmith

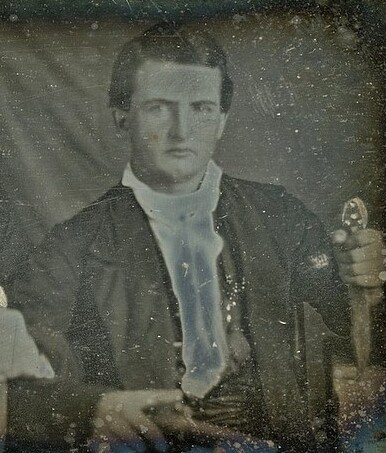
- Black c. 1850
- Born: May 1, 1800; Hackensack, New Jersey, U.S.
- Died: June 22, 1872 (aged 72); Washington, Arkansas, U.S.
- Occupations: Knifemaker, bladesmith
- Spouse: Anne Shaw
- Awards: Blade Cutlery Hall of Fame

James Black (May 1, 1800 – June 22, 1872) was an American knifemaker best known for his improvements to the Bowie knife designed by Jim Bowie.

== Early life ==
James Black was born on May 1, 1800 in Hackensack, New Jersey. James' mother died when he was very young and he had difficulty getting along with his stepmother. Black ran away from home to Philadelphia, Pennsylvania, at age 8 and was apprenticed to a silversmith. At age 18 he migrated westward and took jobs on the Ohio and Mississippi rivers. In about 1820, Black spent some time at Bayou Sara in Louisiana working as a ferryman and as a steamboat deckhand on the Red River which took him upstream to Fulton, Arkansas. Black left the boat and settled at a crossroads 14 miles (23 km) northeast of Fulton that would later become Washington, Arkansas, and Black's permanent home.

== Partnership with William Shaw ==
During his travels, Black had befriended Elijah Stuart. Stuart opened a tavern at Washington and Black was hired by a local blacksmith named William Shaw. Black, due to his previous training, worked on firearms and knives while Shaw concentrated on horse shoes, wagon wheels, and the like. Black would later become a partner in the business with Shaw. Stuart's tavern would become famous as the place where Davy Crockett, Jim Bowie, and William B. Travis created the plan for an independent Texas and Black would go on to create some of the world's finest knives. Black fell in love with his partner's daughter, Anne Shaw, and was forced out of the partnership when Shaw would not allow the marriage. Backed by the note he had received from the dissolved partnership Black purchased some land along the Cossatot River and established a blacksmith's shop, dam, and mill.

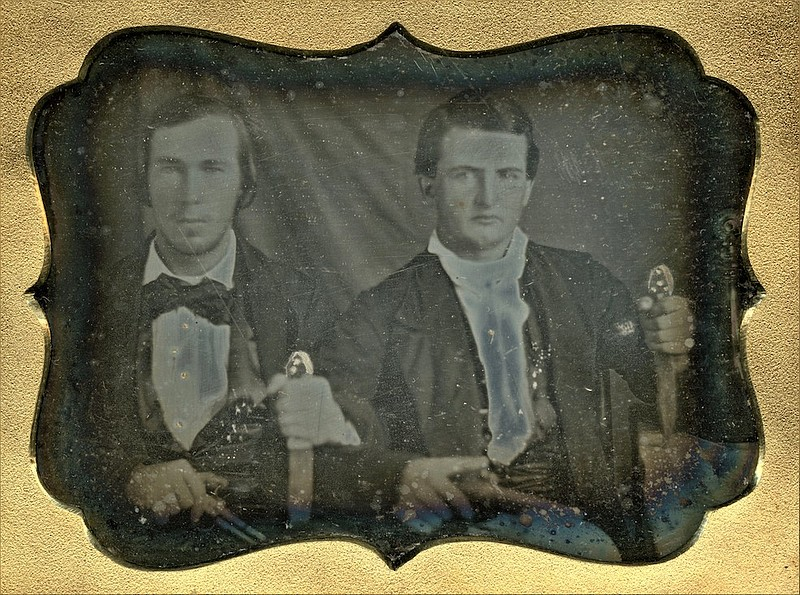
James Black with Jacob Buzzard

Black's endeavor came to an end when he was thrown off of his land. Local officials claimed that the land was Indian treaty land and that Black could not legally inhabit it. Black then discovered that the note he had received from William Shaw for his share of the partnership was actually worthless. Black set up his own blacksmithy in competition with Shaw's and married Shaw's daughter in 1828, despite Shaw's objections and also convinced Shaw's son to join him in his business. Black was soon recognized as the best blacksmith in the area which had a bad effect on his father-in-law's competing shop.

Black and his wife had four sons and a daughter during this period: William Jefferson in 1829, Grandison Deroyston in 1830, Sarah Jane in 1832, John Colbert in 1834, and Sydinham James in 1835. Black became a respected member of the community and served in local government posts.

== Bowie knife and fame ==
In 1830, Black made the famous Bowie knife for Jim Bowie who was already famous for knife-fighting from his 1827 sandbar duel. Bowie's killing of three assassins in Texas and his death at the Battle of the Alamo made him, and Black's knife, legends. After Bowie's death in 1836, Black did a brisk business selling his knives to pioneers bound for Texas. Everyone seemed to want "Jim Bowie's knife." Black forged his knives behind a leather curtain and kept his process a secret. Black's knives were known to be exceedingly tough yet flexible. Many claimed that Black had rediscovered the process to make Damascus steel.

James Black's wife Anne died in 1838; and in 1839, while Black was in bed from an illness, his father-in-law Shaw broke into Black's house and brutally attacked him with a club. Black's life was saved by the family dog; he survived, but his eyes were severely damaged by the attack. He went north to seek medical advice, where his eyes were further damaged by the inept ministrations of a Cincinnati, Ohio, physician. When Black returned to Arkansas he discovered that his father-in-law had sold his business and property, illegally, and disappeared with the cash.

Black lived on a local plantation for a couple of years until, Dr. Isaac Newton Jones took him into his home. Black lived with the Jones family for the next 30 years. He attempted to pass on his knife-making secrets to Daniel Webster Jones, but he could not remember the technique. Jones would later become Governor of Arkansas. James Black died on 22 June 1872 in Washington, Arkansas.

More skeptically, "...[T]here is no direct contemporary evidence to establish that James Black made a knife for James Bowie... The story rests solely on Black's claims made well after he had been adjudged mentally incompetent..." "...[T]he only time that [James Bowie] verifiably used a knife in a personal encounter was on the Sandbar in 1827..." "...[T]o this day there is no known knife bearing his name that is proven authentic, nor positively identified as the work of James Black. Neither is it proven beyond doubt that he even made a knife of any type!” Shifting the question (and the burden of proof) from people to knives, "...[T]he Black explanation remains the most logical way to understand this part of the Bowies' history."

== Bowie knife since Black's death ==
Black's shop has been recreated as part of the Old Washington Historic State Park. Old Washington is the headquarters of the American Bladesmith Society and they maintain a knife-making college at the site. Black's knives are exceedingly rare and are prized by collectors.

Several examples of early Bowie knives are on display at the Historic Arkansas Museum as part of the American Bladesmith Society collection.

In 1996, Black was inducted into the American Bladesmith Society Hall of Fame as an inauguree.

== James Black in fiction ==
- In the 1956 film The Iron Mistress, Black is depicted forging Bowie's knife from iron that he has extracted from a meteorite.
- In 1956, James Black was in the first episode of the CBS television series, The Adventures of Jim Bowie, which was primarily set in 1830s in Louisiana. The show, which starred Scott Forbes as Jim Bowie, was based on the 1946 novel Tempered Blade.
