= William F. Moran (knifemaker) =

American knifemaker (1925–2006)

- Born: William Francis Moran Jr. May 1, 1925; Frederick, Maryland, US
- Died: February 12, 2006 (aged 80); Frederick, Maryland, US
- Occupations: Knifemaker, Bladesmith
- Spouse: Margaret Creager
- Awards: Blade Cutlery Hall of Fame

William Francis Moran Jr. (May 1, 1925 – February 12, 2006) was an American knifemaker who founded the American Bladesmith Society and reintroduced the process of making pattern welded steel (often called "Damascus") to modern knife making. Moran's knives were sought after by celebrities and heads-of-state. In addition to founding the ABS, he was a Blade Magazine Hall of Fame Member and a President of the Knifemakers' Guild.

The school he established at Texarkana College, through partnership with the American Bladesmith Society, was renamed to the "Bill Moran School of Bladesmithing" in his honor.

Moran's original shop in Middletown, Maryland, has been preserved as a working bladesmith shop and museum by the William F. Moran, Jr. Museum & Foundation. The foundation also continues his legacy through classes in bladesmithing, metalworking, and other artisan crafts at the W.F. Moran Bladesmith & Artisan Academy.

== Early life ==
Moran was born on a dairy farm near Lime Kiln, Maryland in 1925. There he learned the craft of blacksmithing by trial and error using an old coal forge that he found on the farm and made his first knife at the age of 12; by the age of 14 he was making knives to sell. As a teenager he taught himself how to forge a blade, obtaining advice from local blacksmiths (although in a 2003 interview with The Washington Post, Moran said he was "getting all the wrong answers" from them) and by the 1950s he was publishing a catalog and selling his forged blades. In 1960 he sold the family farm to become a full-time knife maker.

== Knifemaking ==
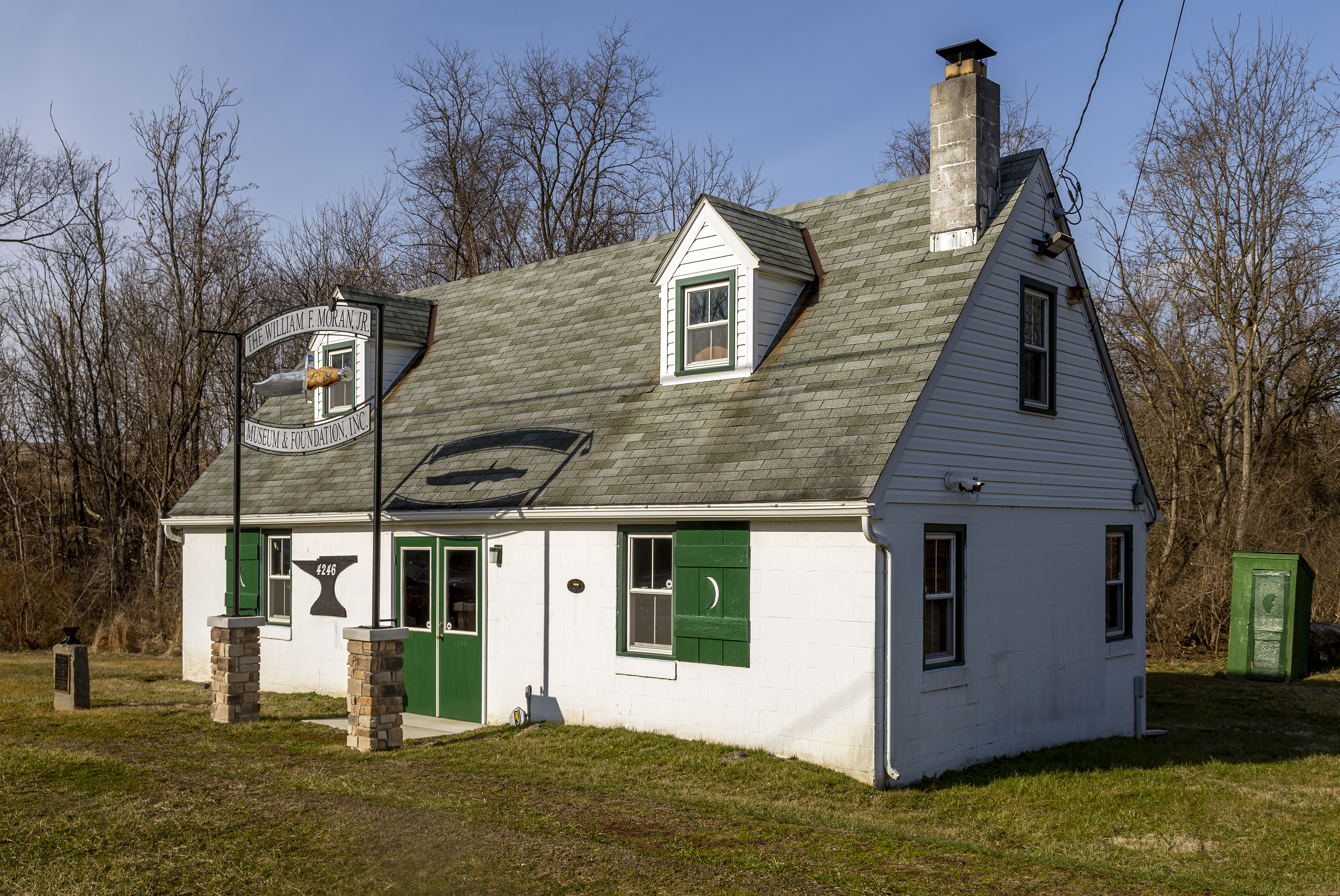
Moran's forge in 2020

Moran forged his knives using a coal forge in the manner of a blacksmith using a hammer and anvil to shape the steel. In the 1950s he was one of the last few bladesmiths in the United States, forging his metal as opposed to grinding blades out of stock. Moran began trying to revive the ancient process of forging Damascus steel in the late 1960s. However, few living bladesmiths knew the exact techniques and without a recipe for the process, it was in danger of being lost; through trial and error he taught himself pattern welding and referred to it as "modern Damascus steel".

In 1972, Moran was elected president of the Knifemakers' Guild. The following year he unveiled his "Damascus knives" at the Guild Show and created a revival of interest in the forged blade, and along with the knives he gave away free booklets detailing how he made them. In 1976 he founded the American Bladesmith Society (ABS), a group of knife makers dedicated to preserving the forged blade and educating the public about traditional bladesmithing techniques. Moran had a 20-year-long waiting list and sold knives to such celebrities as Sylvester Stallone and members of royalty including Queen Elizabeth II and King Abdullah of Saudi Arabia. According to The Washington Post, Sylvester Stallone's knife cost the actor $7,000 and included over 30 feet of silver wire in the handle.

== Death and legacy ==
Moran died of cancer on February 12, 2006, at Frederick Memorial Hospital. After his death, one of his Bowie knives sold for $30,000 at auction. According to his obituary in The Washington Post, Moran willed his forge and tools to the Frederick County Landmarks Foundation.

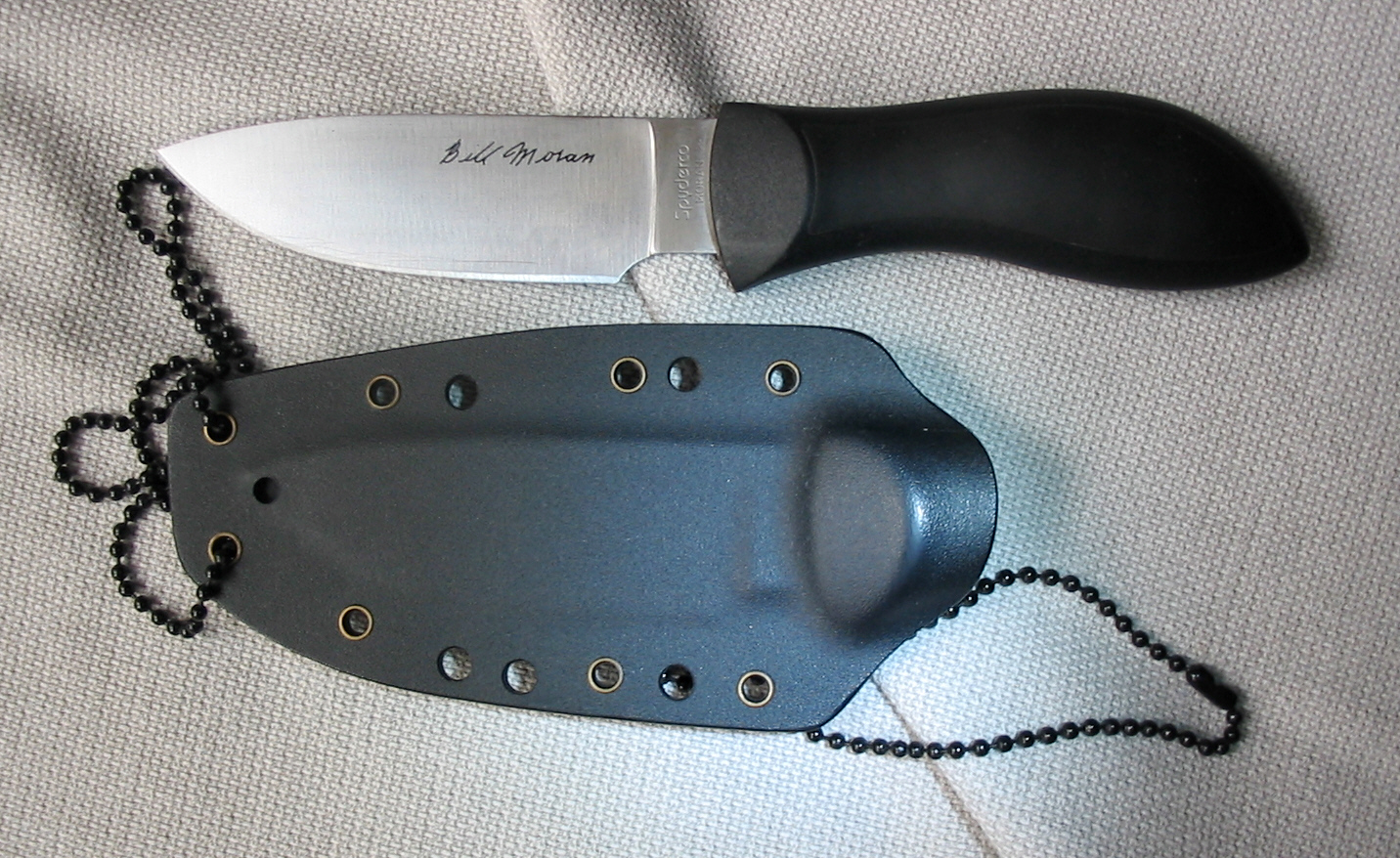
Spyderco Bill Moran Drop Point

Apart from his influence regarding the forged blade, pattern welding, and damascus steel, Moran's influence has spread to other realms of the cutlery industry beyond "Art Knives". Copies of Moran's knives have been made by production knife companies. Spyderco has long made a Drop point hunting knife, inspired by Moran designs. Blackjack Knives made several tactical versions of Moran's fighting knives. Paul Chen's Hanwei Forge of China made a damascus steel version of the Moran Kenshar, complete with silver wire inlay. Custom knifemaker Ernest Emerson has long stated that the Moran ST-23 was one of the inspirations for his CQC-8 folding knife.

In 1986, Moran was inducted into the Blade Magazine Cutlery Hall of Fame. Two years later in 1988, Moran and the ABS founded a Bladesmithing School in cooperation with Texarkana College. The campus was located in Washington, Arkansas near the place where James Black made the first Bowie knife. In 1996, Moran was inducted into the American Bladesmith Society Hall of Fame as an inauguree. From 1988 to 2001, Moran taught at least one class a year at the school. Upon his retirement from teaching in 2001, the school was renamed the "Bill Moran School of Bladesmithing". This school was moved to the main campus of the college in 2019.

In 2006, the William F. Moran, Jr. Museum & Foundation was established as a 501(c)(3) nonprofit — dedicated to preserving and sharing Moran's legacy as an artisan and teacher. The foundation retained Moran's original shop as a museum/working forge and trains students in the continuing developments of "modern Damascus" techniques. In October 2022, the William F. Moran, Jr. Museum & Foundation officially opened the W.F. Moran Bladesmith & Artisan Academy.
