= Sword making =

Process of forging swords

Sword making, historically, has been the work of specialized smiths or metalworkers called bladesmiths or swordsmiths. Swords have been made of different materials over the centuries, with a variety of tools and techniques. While there are many criteria for evaluating a sword, generally the four key criteria are hardness, strength, flexibility and balance. Early swords were made of copper, which bends easily. Bronze swords were stronger. By varying the amount of tin in the alloy, a smith could make different parts of the sword harder or tougher to suit the demands of combat service. The Roman gladius was an early example of swords forged from blooms of steel.

A good sword has to be hard enough to hold an edge along a length which can range from 18 in (46 cm) to more than 36 in (91 cm). At the same time, it must be strong enough and flexible enough that it can absorb massive shocks at just about any point along its length and not crack or break. Finally, it should be balanced along its length so that it can be wielded effectively.

== Bronze swords ==
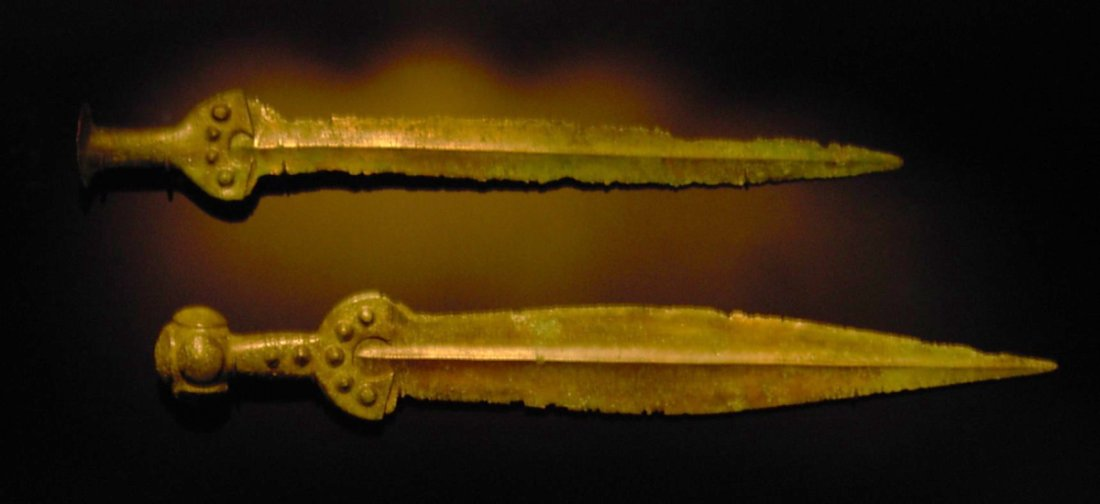
Apa type swords, 17th century BC.

Bronze items are typically cast, not forged. Secondary operations involve removing material from the roughcasting, polishing, and the application of decorative elements. Some Chinese swords used high-tin bronze for the edges, since it is harder, and keeps a sharp edge longer, but is more brittle than the softer, lower-tin alloy used for the blade's core. Bronze alloys with lower tin content are tougher, or more resistant to fracturing.

== Forming ==
Swords can be shaped by a variety of metalworking techniques. In some times and places, one technique has been used exclusively, in others a combination of techniques have been used. The primary techniques are forging and stock removal.

Forging uses heat to bring the material to a malleable state. The material is then hammered to shape, typically using hammer and anvil together with specialized set and fuller tools depending on the particular technique. There is a variety of forging techniques for sword making and many variations upon those.

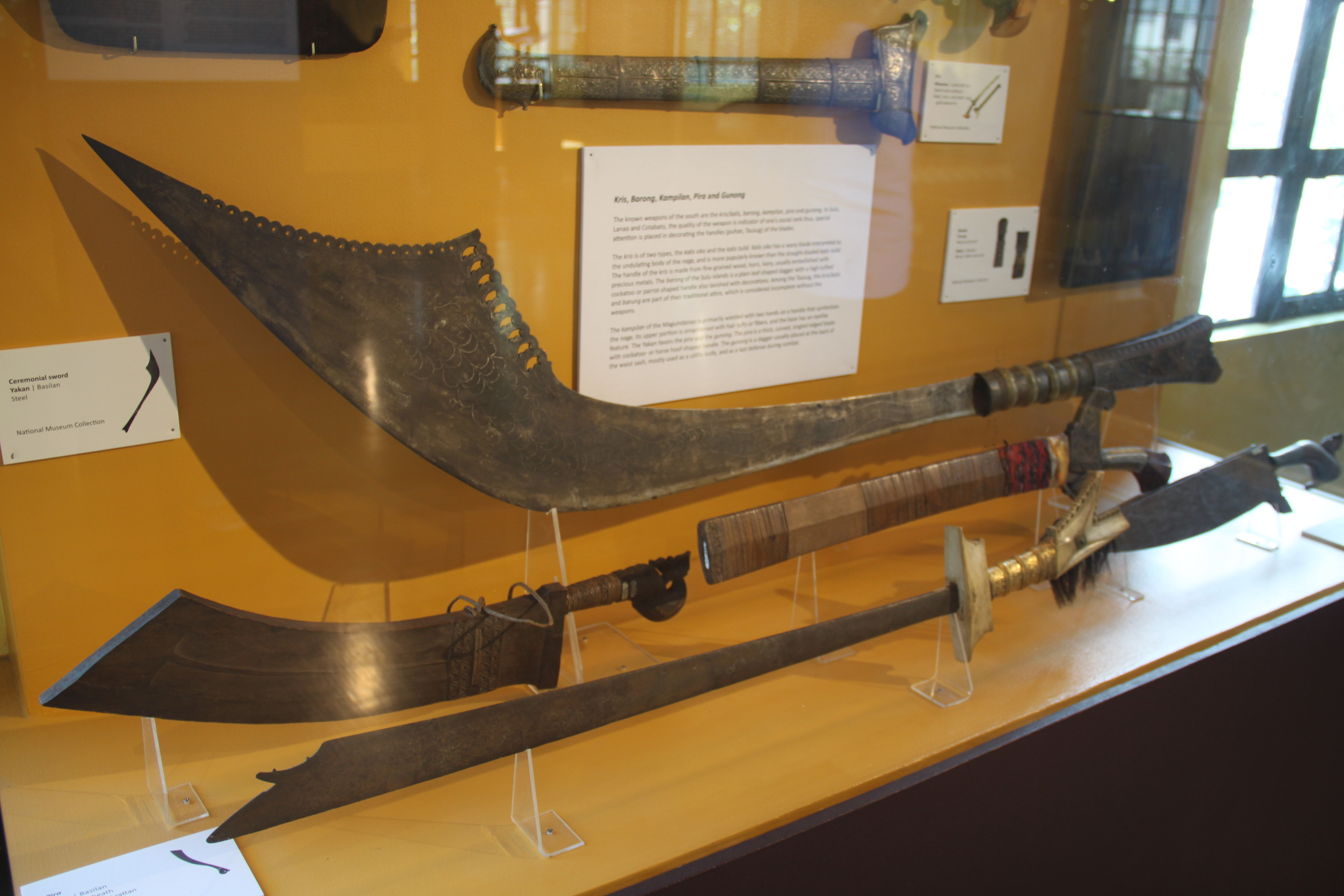
Ceremonial swords from the Philippines.

Stock removal shapes the sword from prepared stock that is larger in all dimensions than the finished sword by filing, grinding and cutting. While the technique has been available for centuries, it was not widely used for making swords until the 19th or 20th century as it was wasteful of the raw material. This method is frequently used where iron and steel are plentiful because it requires less time. In places and times where iron and steel have been more rare and valuable, stock removal has not been used except as part of the finishing process.

In most techniques, the basic materials, generally iron and/or steel, are shaped into a bar or billet first. At this stage, if several metals are to be used they will be combined by welding to form the billet. In some techniques, notably the traditional folded steel blades of China, Korea, and Japan, the billet might be drawn, folded and welded back on itself creating layers of steel of different types. In others, longer bars or rods of steel and iron might be welded together, edge to edge, to create the basic billet placing the softer iron inside with the steel at the core and edges. Once the billet is created it is drawn out further, generally tapering to the edge(s) and point. The technique of fullering might be used to create a ridge or ridges down the length of the blade. Whether single or multiple, the ridge's main purpose is to give the blade greater structural strength relative to its mass.

During fabrication, the metal might be annealed to relieve stresses built up from forging and differential heating, and to make the metal easier to file, engrave or polish.

=== Heat treating ===
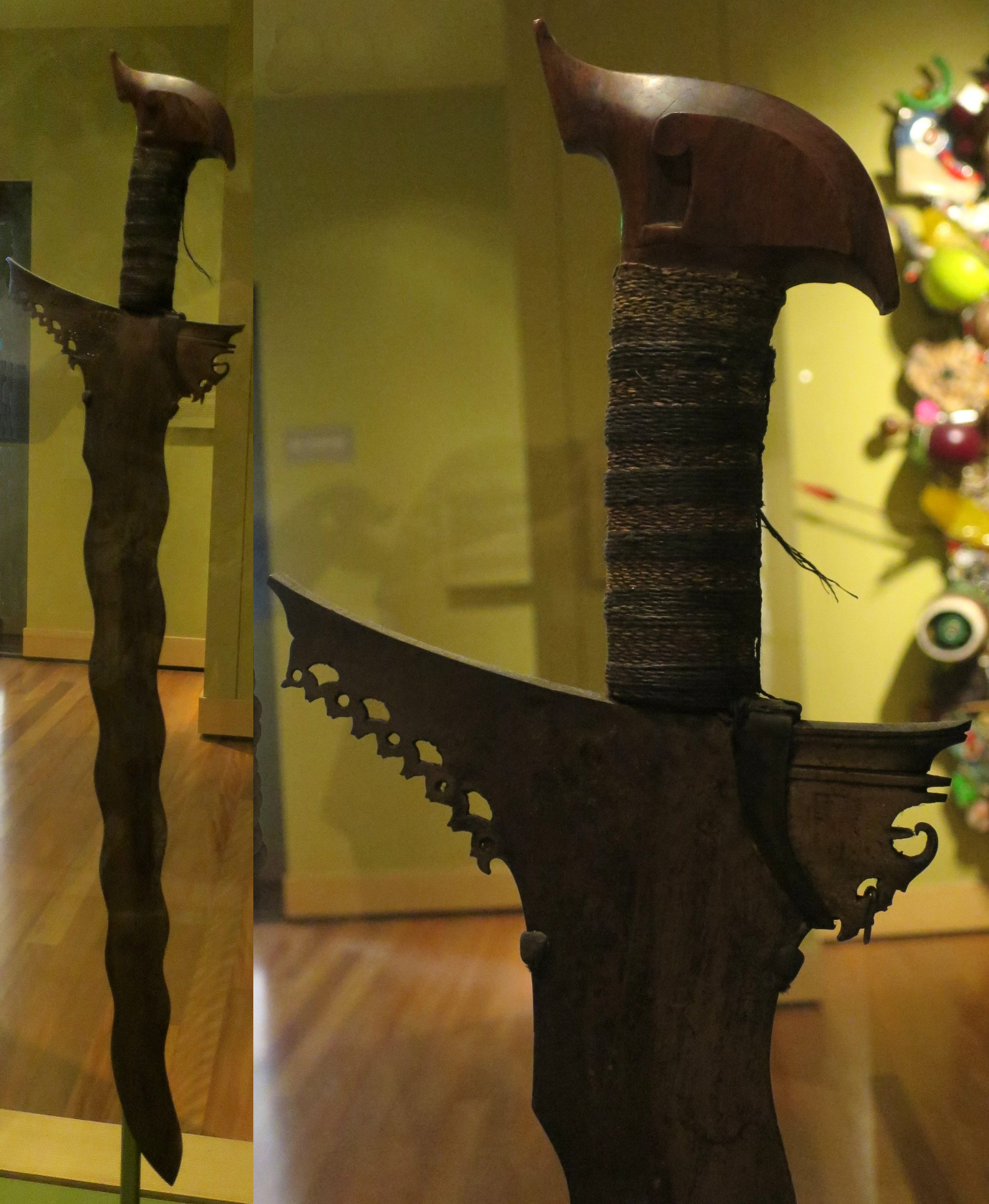
Kalis from the Philippines.

After the workpiece is done being formed, it is normalized. The blade is carefully and evenly heated and then cooled slowly. The point of normalizing is to remove the stresses which may have built up within the body of the blade while it was being forged. During the forging process, the blade might be heated and cooled differentially creating stress, some parts may be hammered more than others, some areas hammered enough to harden them. If these stresses are left in the blade they could affect the finishing and when it came time to heat treat the blade, the hardening and tempering might not be as even. Enough stress could be added that the blade would be weak in spots, which could result in the blade failing entirely.

One of the last processes in fabricating a sword is quenching and tempering it. Quenching hardens the metal so it holds an edge longer, but this also makes it very brittle. To restore some ductility and durability, the sword is tempered. With swords, due to their length, the challenge is greater as in a typical quenching because it is possible to bend or warp the blade if it is not introduced to the quenchant smoothly and evenly.

Swords could also be differentially hardened so that some parts, like the cutting edge, are harder than the body.

=== Finishing ===
Finishing encompasses polishing, decorating, and crafting and assembling the hilt, guard and sheath.

The swordsmith would be most concerned with the state of the blade itself and possibly decorating the blade and preparing the guards and pommel. Other artisans would likely be involved in the work of fashioning the hilt, sheath and other furniture and in any fine decoration.

== By country ==
=== Italy ===
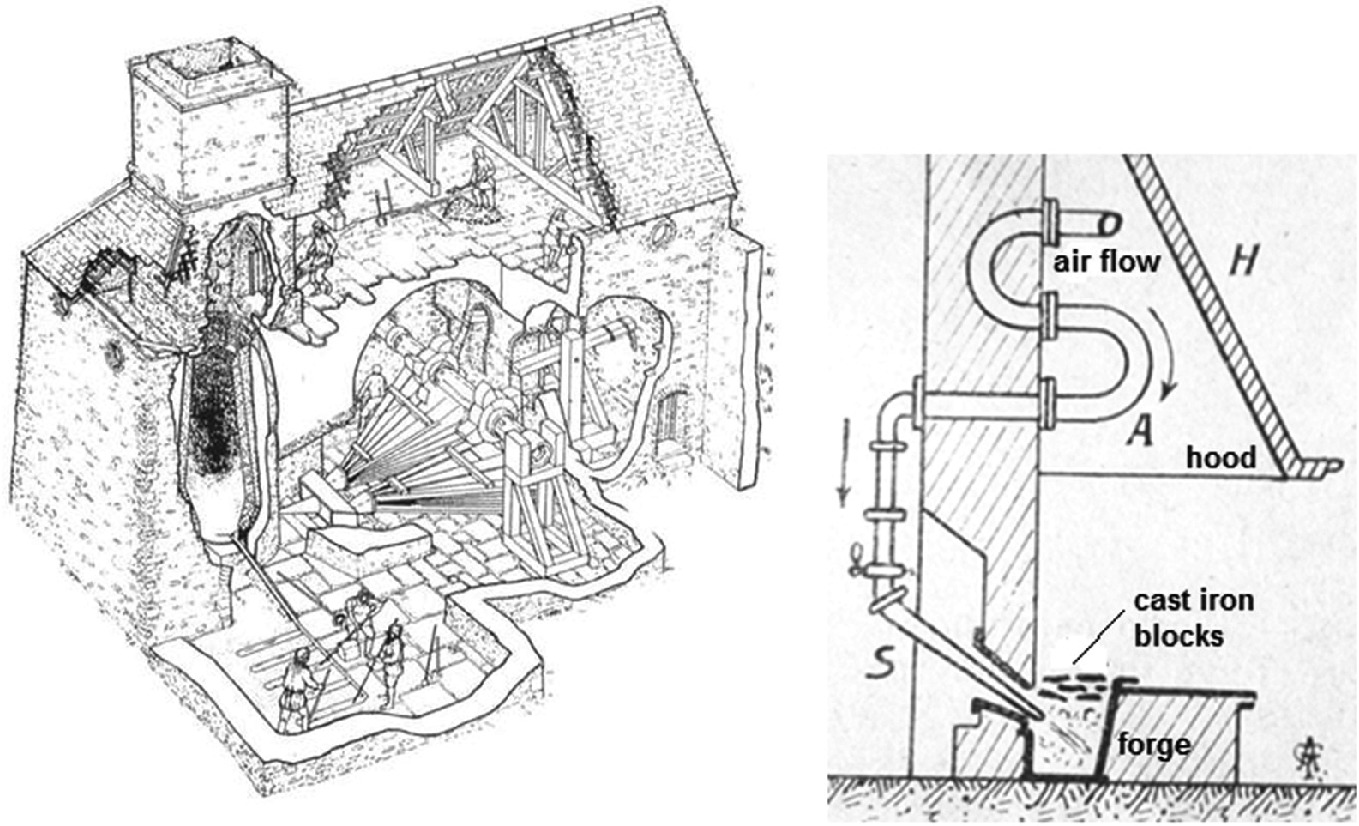
A diagram of a pre-industrial "Brescian Forge", typical of Northern Italian steel works.

It has been speculated by researchers that swordsmithing has been performed in the northern regions of Italy since at least the 10th Century BCE. Areas around Tuscany and Brescia had rich iron ore veins and forests that were conducive to the creation of charcoal for high-heat iron smithing. Brescia remained an important swordsmithing and steel manufacturing hub for centuries due to the abundance of manganese content of the local iron ore deposits, which assisted in the creation of high-quality steel.

=== Japan ===
==== Forging ====
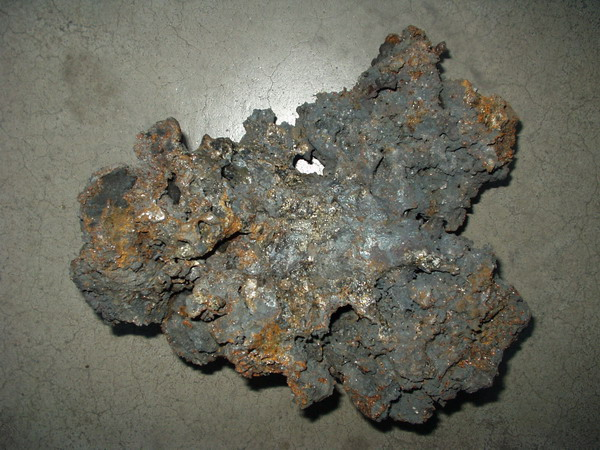
Tamahagane

Japanese smiths discovered, similarly to many others, that iron sand (with little to no sulfur and phosphorus) heated together with coal (carbon) made the steel they called tamahagane. This allows the sword to have the strength and the ability to hold a sharp edge, as well as to cause the sword to tend to bend rather than flex under stress. The process starts in the combining of the iron and carbon, by heating iron sand to 1200-1500 degrees Celsius in a traditional furnace, or tatara, for 72 hours. The tamahagane is then cooled and the smelter selects the best pieces to send to the swordsmith.

==== Swordsmith ====
The swordsmith takes the tamahagane nuggets and forges them into a block. In the process of forming, the block is heated to around 900 degrees Celsius. Taken out of the fire and hammered into a thinner block, the block is scored in the center with an axe and folded over, making it thick again. The block is then placed back in the fire. The steel can be folded transversely or longitudinally. Both folding directions are often used to produce the desired grain pattern. This process, called the shita-kitae, is repeated from 8 to as many as 16 times. After 20 foldings, there is too much diffusion in the carbon content; the steel becomes almost homogeneous in this respect, and the act of folding no longer gives any benefit to the steel.

Depending on the amount of carbon introduced, this process forms either the very hard steel for the edge called hagane, or the slightly less hardenable spring steel called kawagane, which is often used for the sides and the back. Once the sword took the shape the swordsmith wanted, the swordsmith would clay the spine of the sword, called tsuchioki, and heat it again. Once the sword was red hot, the swordsmith took the newly formed sword and quenched it in water, hardening the blade. He would then pass it on to a polisher and finisher.

==== Polishers and finishers ====
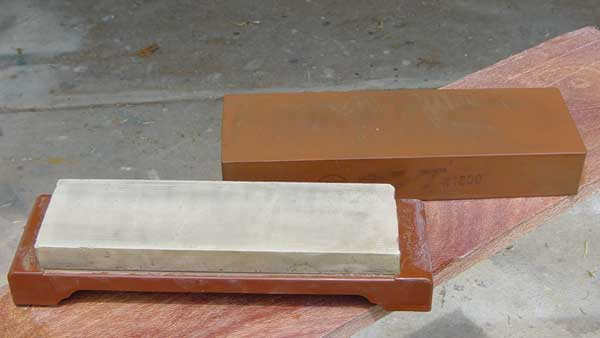
Two Japanese waterstones

Once the blade had been heat-treated, a sword would be ground with progressively finer abrasives, typically different types of rock. Some grinding rocks can range in the thousands of dollars today. They would polish and sharpen the sword until the desired finish was achieved. This process is long and tedious, but a good polisher was of great value to the swordsmith and was often paid well. After the sword was polished, the fine tip could be sharpened. The sharpness of a sword, and ability to keep that edge, is based on the angle of the edge and the width of the body of the sword. How long it can hold the edge is also dependent on the material used.

== Modern sword making ==
Swords are still being made by modern artisans. Some pursue the traditional methods while others apply modern tools, techniques and materials to the craft. The vast majority of commercially available swords have been made with modern tools and materials as it brings greater profit and less time than hand forging. Most commercially available swords have been manufactured by stock removal.

== See also ==
- Sharpening
- Japanese swordsmithing
