= Robert Kramer (disambiguation) =

Robert Kramer (1939–1999) was an American film director, screenwriter, and actor. Robert or Bob Kramer or similar may also refer to:

- Bob Kramer (born 1958), an American bladesmith
- Bob Kraemer (born 1950), Canadian football receiver
- Bob Kremer (born 1936), American politician
- Bob Kramer (basketball) (1922–1978), American basketball player
- Robert S. Kraemer (1928–2013), American aerospace engineer

== See also ==
- Robert Cramer (disambiguation)
