= Robert Cramer =

Robert Cramer may refer to:

- Robert E. Cramer (born 1947), United States Representative from Alabama's 5th Congressional District
- Robert Cramer (Swiss politician) (born 1954)

== See also ==
- Robert Kramer (disambiguation)
