= American Bladesmith Society =

Non-profit organization in the United States

- Abbreviation: ABS
- Formation: 1976; 50 years ago
- Founder: William F. Moran
- Type: Nonprofit
- Members: 114 Master Bladesmiths (2025)
- Chairman: Kevin Cashen
- 1st Vice Chair: Harvey Dean
- Secretary: Brion Tomberlin
- Treasurer: Bill Wiggins
- Board of directors: Robert Calvert; Burt Foster; B.R. Hughes; Veronique Laurent; Don McIntosh; Greg Neely; James Rodebaugh; Robert Wilson; Mark Zalesky
- Main organ: Board
- Website: americanbladesmith.com

The American Bladesmith Society, or ABS, is a non-profit organization composed of knifemakers whose primary function is to promote the techniques of forging steel blades. The ABS was founded by knifemaker William F. Moran, who came up with the concept in 1972 when he was Chairman of the Knifemakers' Guild; the following year, he introduced Damascus steel blades at an annual show. In 1976, he incorporated the organization, and it received non-profit status in 1985.

ABS knifemakers forge their blades, as opposed to making them via the stock-removal method. The ABS has developed a system of ratings designating whether a member is an Apprentice, a Journeyman, or a Master smith. The ABS has partnered with several colleges to offer courses in bladesmithing and has launched its own museum.

As of 2022, the chairman of the board of directors of ABS is Steve Dunn.

== History ==
Bill Moran had been elected chairman of the Knifemakers' Guild in 1972. At that time, there were fewer than a dozen practicing bladesmiths in America, and this number was decreasing, whereas the number of stock removal knifemakers was increasing. To remedy this, Moran unveiled 8 pattern welded blades at the 1973 show, dubbing them "Damascus Steel," and he handed out a booklet on how to forge the steel to the knifemakers in attendance.

Within months, a handful of knifemakers had begun making Damascus blades: Bill Bagwell, Don Hastings, Michael Connor, and Sid Birt. By 1976 more than a dozen bladesmiths were making Damascus steel, and on December 4, 1976, Moran wrote the by-laws.

In 1985, the ABS held its first "hammer-in" at Dubois, Wyoming in conjunction with the University of Wyoming. The following year it was moved to Washington, Arkansas in conjunction with Texarkana College. This campus had a replica of James Black’s blacksmith shop where, during the winter of 1830–1831, American frontiersman James Bowie purchased a knife from Black. This hammer-in, named the Piney Woods Hammer-In, still occurs semi-annually.

In 1988, the ABS established the criteria for Mastersmith and Journeyman. In 1991, Moran stepped down as its President. But the Society unanimously elected him “Chairman Emeritus,” meaning that he would serve on the board for the balance of his life.

In 1988, on the grounds of Historic Washington State Park in Hempstead County, Arkansas, the ABS and Texarkana College founded a Bladesmithing School in collaboration with the Pioneer Washington Foundation and the Arkansas State Parks. The campus was located near where historians believed that James Black had first forged the Bowie knife. From 1988 to 2001, Bill Moran taught at least one class a year at the school, from basic knife making to the forging of Damascus steel. Upon his retirement from teaching in 2001, the school was renamed the William F. Moran School of Bladesmithing. The American Bladesmith Society is now associated with Texarkana College in Arkansas, Haywood Community College in North Carolina, and the New England School of Metalwork in Maine which offer Bladesmithing courses taught by experienced ABS Master Smiths and Journeyman Smiths.

== Hall of fame ==
The ABS launched its own museum and Hall of Fame in Little Rock, Arkansas in 1995 in conjunction with the Historic Arkansas Museum. The first year inductions were held in 1996: James Black, James Bowie, Don Hastings, B. R. Hughes, William F. Moran, and William Scagel.

== Ratings ==
=== Apprentice ===
Bladesmiths join the ABS as Regular members and are rated as Apprentice Smiths. After a three-year period as a member, they may apply for the Journeyman test.

=== Journeyman ===
An applicant is eligible to apply for Journeyman Smith judging and rating at the Annual ABS meeting, after they have been a member of the ABS for 3 years. Following the "Introduction to Bladesmithing Course," the applicant may take the test under the supervision of a Master Smith. The applicant must have personally forged and performed all work on the test blade, with no other person physically assisting in its construction or heat-treating. The test knife must be a carbon steel forged blade with a maximum overall length of 15 inches (380 mm), maximum width of 2 inches (51 mm) and blade length of 10 inches (250 mm). Damascus blades or laminated blades are not allowed as test blades. Once the test begins, no work, not even light stropping, may be done to the test blade. The test blade is used to cut a free-hanging rope, chop through two 2 inches (51 mm) by 4 inches (100 mm) pieces of lumber, after which it must retain an edge capable of shaving hair from the judge's arm. Lastly, the knife is placed into a vise and flexed. The knife must spring back without breaking and must remain functional. If successful, the applicant must submit 5 forged carbon steel knives for judging on symmetry, balance, and aesthetics. Knifemakers who have attained this title frequently use the suffix "JS" when informing the public about their knives.

=== Master smith ===
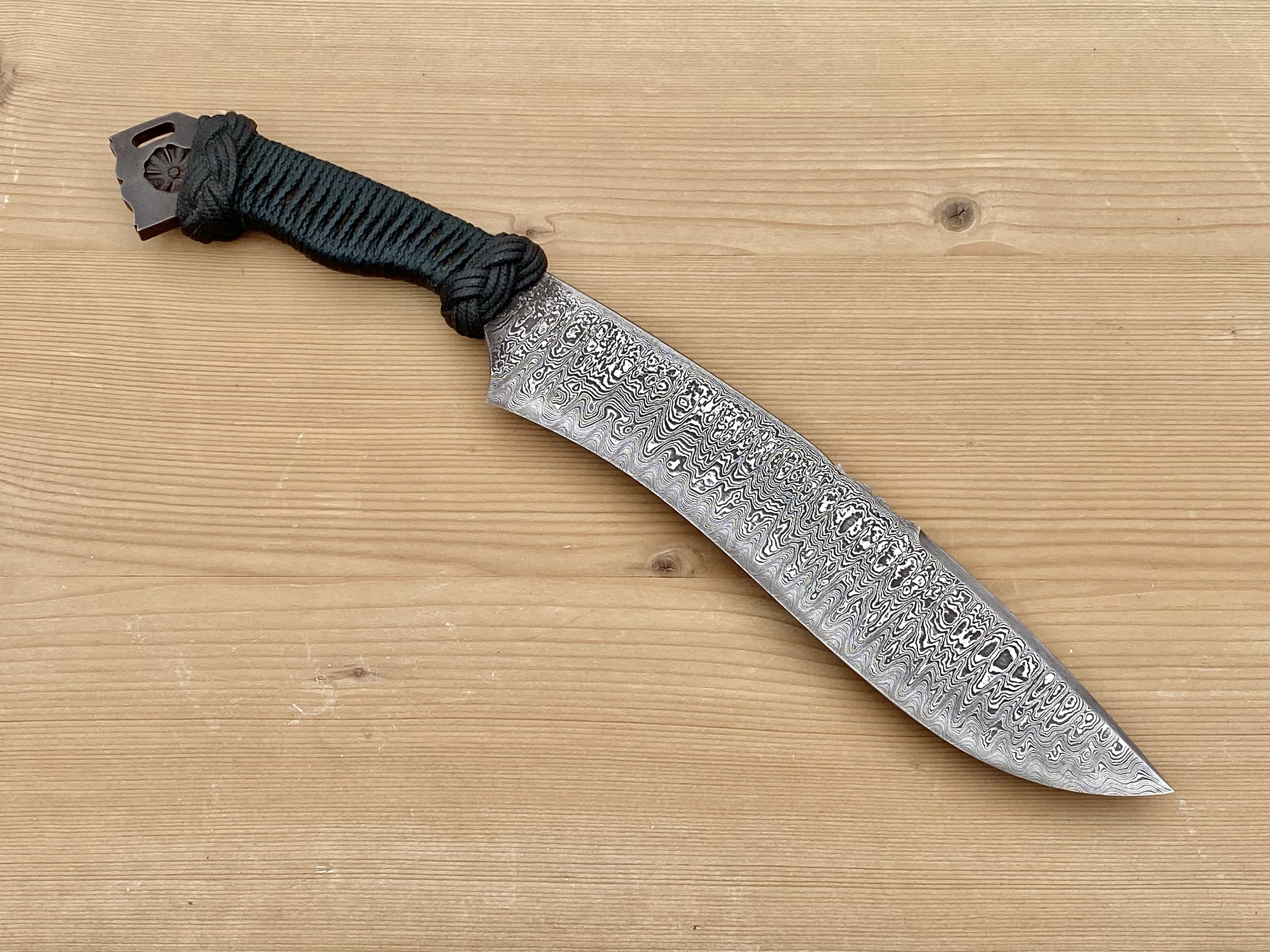
A modern "Damascus knife" produced in the United States by Master Bladesmith Jimmy Fikes.

At the New York Knife Show in 1981, the first Master bladesmith ratings were awarded to: Bill Bagwell, Jimmy Fikes, Don Fogg, Don Hastings, Bill Moran, and James Schmidt. Years later, tests were established for a maker to attain a rating of "Master smith." The tests for Master smith include using a forged Damascus steel blade with a minimum of 300 layers and fashioned as a "stick tang knife" (as opposed to a full-tang) to cut a free hanging rope, chop through 2 2X4" pieces of lumber, and retain an edge capable of shaving hair. Lastly, the knife is placed into a vise and flexed for 90 degrees. The knife must spring back without breaking, must remain functional, and must not slip from the handle. Once the performance test is passed, the applicant must submit 5 knives to a panel of judges; all knives are judged on balance, beauty, and symmetry, but one must be either an "Art Knife" or a "European style" dagger. The first smith to receive the Master title under these requirements was Wayne Goddard. Wyoming knifemaker Audra Draper became the first woman to hold a Master smith title in 1999. Knifemakers who have attained this title frequently use the suffix "MS" when informing the public about their knives.
