= Bladesmith =

Person who uses an anvil and forge to make various types of blades

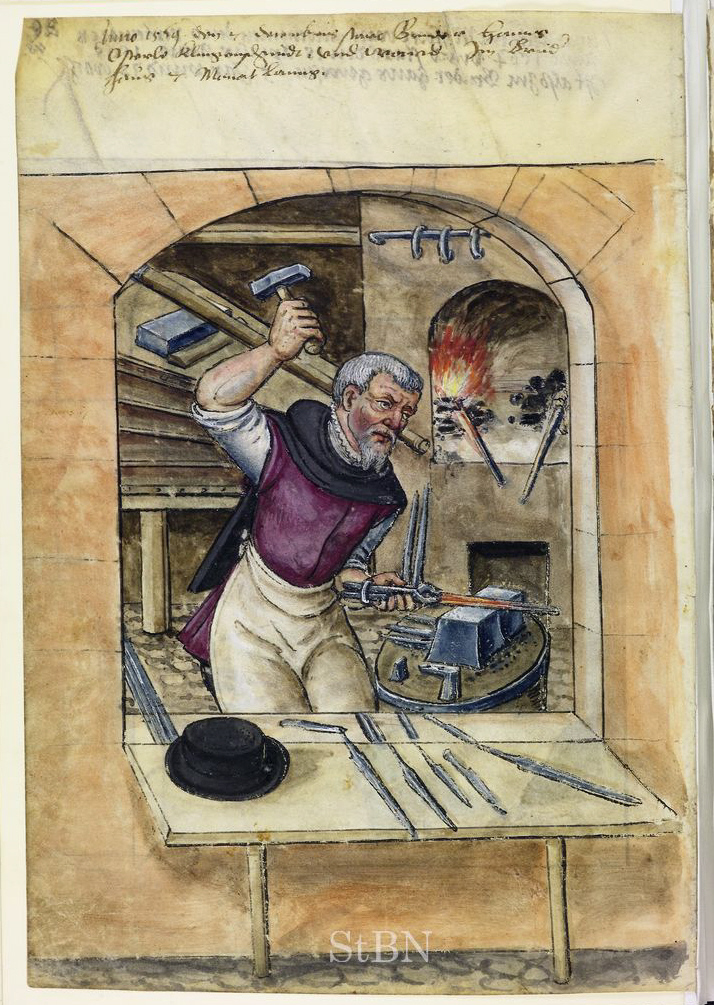
Bladesmith, Nuremberg, Germany, 1569

Bladesmithing is the art of making knives, swords, daggers and other blades using a forge, hammer, anvil, and other smithing tools. Bladesmiths employ a variety of metalworking techniques similar to those used by blacksmiths, as well as woodworking for knife and sword handles, and often leatherworking for sheaths. Bladesmithing is an art that is thousands of years old and found in cultures as diverse as China, Japan, India, Germany, Korea, the Middle East, Spain and the British Isles. As with any art shrouded in history, there are myths and misconceptions about the process. While traditionally bladesmithing referred to the manufacture of any blade by any means, the majority of contemporary craftsmen referred to as bladesmiths are those who primarily manufacture blades by means of using a forge to shape the blade as opposed to knifemakers who form blades by use of the stock removal method, although there is some overlap between both crafts.

== Related trades ==
Many blade smiths were known by other titles according to the kind of blade that they produced:

- A swordsmith's specialty is making swords.
- A knifemaker makes knives and other cutlery.
- A scythesmith is a smith who makes scythes.

== Historic bladesmithing ==
Historically speaking, bladesmithing is an art that has survived and thrived over thousands of years. Many different parts of the world have different styles of bladesmithing, some more well-known than others.

=== Egyptian ===
Ancient Egyptians referred to iron as "copper from the heavens" because their lack of smelting technology limited their accessible iron supplies to what little native iron they could recover from meteorites. Despite iron's rarity, they gained enough familiarity with ironworking techniques to have used wrought iron in the manufacture of swords and blades as early as 3000 BC. They exported this technique to Assyria, Babylon and Greece through trade and as they conquered other lands and were conquered themselves.

=== Celtic ===
The Proto-Celtic Hallstatt culture (8th century BC) were among the earliest users of iron swords. During the Hallstatt period, they made swords both in bronze as well as iron with rounded tips. Toward the end of the Hallstatt period, around 600-500BC, these swords were replaced with short daggers. The La Tene culture reintroduced the sword, which were very different from the traditional shape and construction of the Bronze Age and early Iron Age, characterized by a more pointed tip.

=== Chinese ===
Traditional Chinese blades (jians) are usually of sanmei (three plate) construction, which involved sandwiching a core of hard steel between two plates of softer steel. The central plate protrudes slightly from its surrounding pieces, allowing for a sharp edge, while the softer spine protects the brittle core. Some blades had wumei or five plate construction, with two more soft plates being used at the central ridge. Bronze jian were often made in a somewhat similar manner: in this case an alloy with a high copper content would be used to make a resilient core and spine, while the edge would be made from a high-tin-content alloy for sharpness and welded onto the rest of the blade.

The swordsmiths of China are often credited with the forging technology that was carried to Korea and Japan, allowing swordsmiths in those places to create such weapons as the katana. This technology included folding, inserting alloys, and differential hardening of the edge, which historically has been the most common technique around the world. While the Japanese would be more influenced by the Chinese dāo (single-edged swords of various forms), the early Japanese swords known as ken are often based on the jian. One-sided jians from the Tang dynasty provided the basis for various Japanese forging styles and techniques. The Korean version of the jian is known as the geom or gum, and these swords often preserve features found in Ming-era jian, such as openwork pommels and sharply angled tips.

=== Korean ===
Korea has a history of swordsmithing dating back 3,000 years. Although Korea was in close proximity to both Japan and China, no native systems of swordsmanship and swordmaking developed in Korea.

Korean swords include long swords such as the yeoh do, geom, and hyup do and curved swords such as Samindo. Metal swords of double bladed leaf structure have been found throughout Korea dating back to the Bronze Age. These bronze swords were around 32 cm (13 in) in overall length, with a short handle.

=== Japanese ===
The technology that led to the development of the Japanese sword originated in China and was brought to Japan by way of Korea. The oldest steel swords found in Japan date to the fourth or fifth century A.D. Although appearing to be ceremonial in nature, samples of these straight blades preserved in the Shōsōin were hand-forged with hardened cutting edges. By the time of the Heian period (794—1185 AD) the Japanese sword took on its distinctive curved shape as a mounted horseman would have more use for a slashing type of blade as opposed to a thrusting type. These swords were known as tachi.

Due to the quality of metal found in Japan, Japanese bladesmithing became an extremely rigid, precise process, involving folding and forge-welding the steel many times over to create a laminated blade. By the time of the Kamakura period (1185–1333 AD), Japan was under the rule of a military class and repelling Mongol invasions. This became known as the "Golden era" of Japanese bladesmithing under Emperor Toba II, who became a bladesmith himself. After abdicating, Toba II summoned Japan's finest bladesmiths around him in an effort to develop the perfect sword. It was determined that a sword had to be hard in order to maintain a sharp cutting edge, yet hard steel is brittle and can shatter under the stress of a heavy blow. Swordsmiths in Japan found the solution by wrapping a softer low-carbon steel core such as wrought iron, in a jacket of high-carbon steel and then hardening the edge. However, under heavy usage, the edge would be more prone to chipping than its European counterparts, which were typically designed to deal with heavier armor than Japanese blades. This was answered by allowing projections of softer steel known as ashi to form in the hardened cutting edge during differential hardening of the blade.

The Mongol invasions brought with them a need for swords also suited for hand-to-hand combat and the smiths began manufacture of shorter blades to meet this need. It was during the Muromachi period that the katana and tantō came into being. By the sixteenth century, Japanese bladesmithing had become so renowned throughout Asia that the Japanese turned to large scale manufacturing of swords as an export to China. Smiths at Sakai also crafted knives for cutting tobacco, which had been introduced by the Portuguese. The Sakai bladesmithing industry received a major boost from the Tokugawa shogunate (1603–1868), which granted Sakai a special seal of approval and enhanced its reputation for quality.

The Haitorei Edict in 1876 banned carrying of swords in public, which, combined with the decimation of the samurai class caused a heavy decline in the number of swords produced throughout the country. Sword-making was completely banned following World War II and did not resume until 1953, under heavy restrictions to preserve it solely as an art. In modern-day Japan a swordsmith is still only allowed to manufacture two swords a month by law, for example. As a result, many smiths travel to Taiwan or China to make extra swords for the export market as foreign-made swords are also illegal in Japan. Bladesmithing is still practiced in the cities of Sakai (Osaka Prefecture) and Seki (Gifu Prefecture).

=== Germanic ===
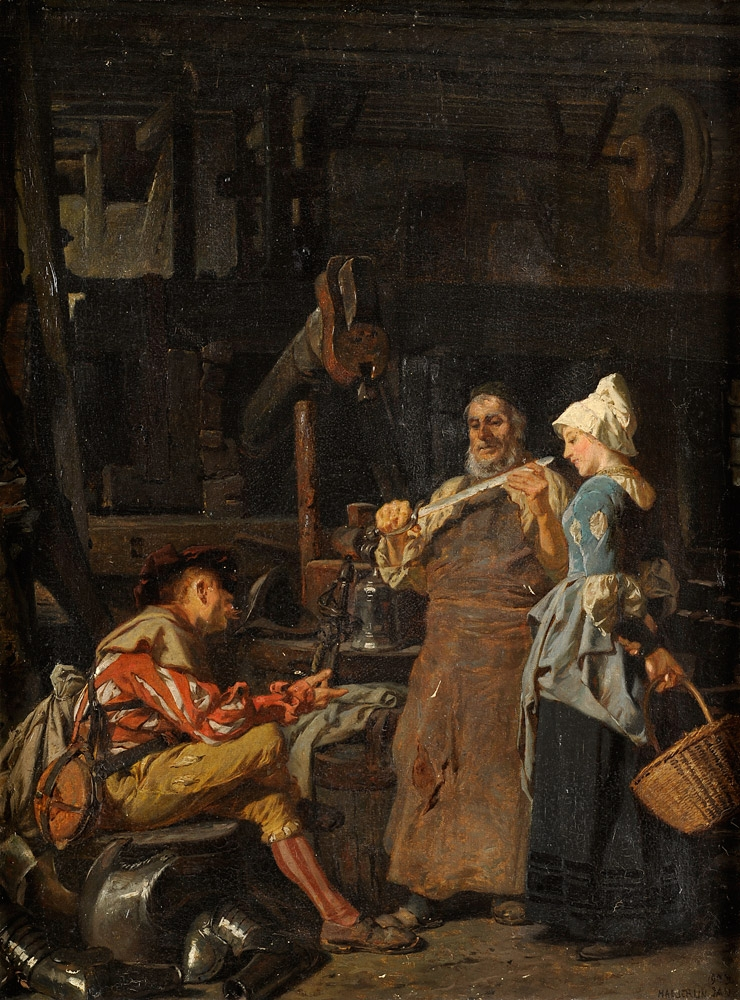
At the Bladesmith's, by Carl von Häberlin (1879)

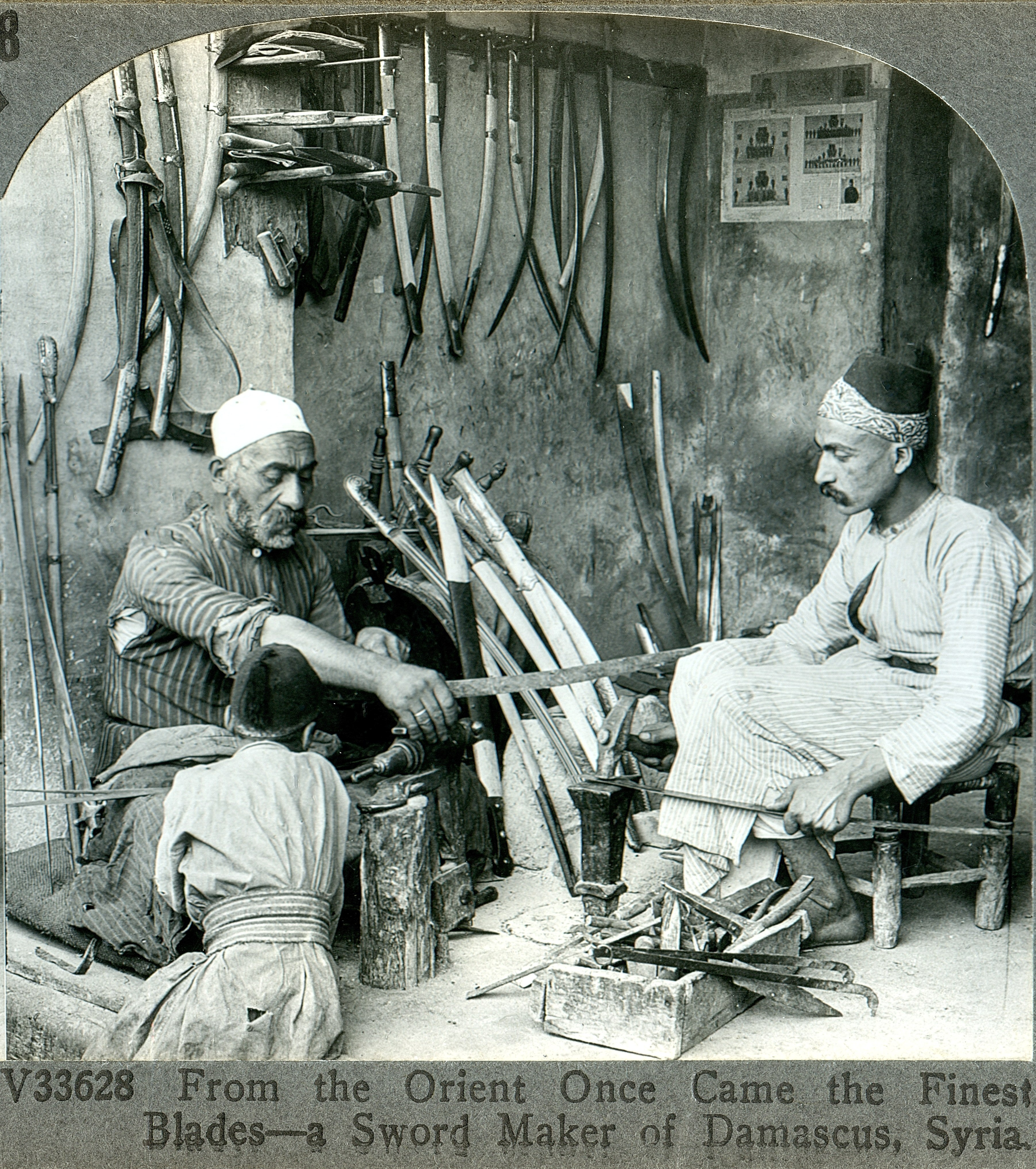
A sword-maker from Damascus, Syria, c. 1900

The Germanic Migration period peoples also had advanced bladesmithing techniques for their level of technology. Migration Era smiths would often forge-weld blades of multiple materials, and their blades were typically double-edged and straight. Migration Era blades were often forged with a hard steel edge wrapped around a pattern welded core. Pattern welding was adopted from the neighbouring Romans, who had employed such technique since the second century AD.

=== Indian ===
Bladesmithing was common practice in India during the Middle Ages. A special type of steel known as Wootz or Damascus steel was often used in South Asia. The term Damascus steel can refer to two different types of artefacts. One is the true Damascus steel, or Wootz steel, which is a high carbon alloy with tremendous edge retention possibly due to its composition of carbon nanotubes and carbide nanowires, with a wavy surface texture originating from the crystalline structure of alloy metals such as tungsten and vanadium - elements that occur naturally in iron ore from southern India - to the surface during the manufacturing process. Sirohi sword represents the peak of Indian swordmaking craftsmanship. This is still in debate as metallurgist John Verhoeven at Iowa State University believes the nanowires to occur in most steels. The other is a composite structure made by welding together iron and steel to give a visible pattern on the surface, called pattern welded steel. Although both were referred to as Damascus steels, true Damascus steels were not replicated in Europe until 1821.

=== Spain ===
Between the 15th and 17th centuries the Toledo sword-making industry enjoyed a great boom, to the point where its products came to be regarded as the best in Europe.

=== Middle East ===
Damascus Steel was commonly used in the Middle East.

== Modern bladesmithing ==
Bladesmithing began declining after the Industrial Revolution. With improvements in steel production, bladesmiths no longer had to forge steel and knives could be machined from flat bars of steel. As cutlery companies moved to mass production of blades and machine tools became more available, the art of forging steel began to disappear as knifemakers could grind blades out of existing stock. By the mid 20th century, bladesmithing had been relegated to a cottage industry carried out by a handful of bladesmiths.

One of these bladesmiths was William F. Moran, who forged his knives using a coal forge in the manner of a blacksmith using a hammer and anvil to shape the steel. Moran began trying to revive the ancient process of forging Damascus steel in the late 1960s. However, no living bladesmith knew the exact techniques and without a recipe for the process, it was in danger of being lost; through trial and error he taught himself pattern welding and referred to his end product as "Damascus steel".

In 1972, Moran was elected president of the Knifemakers' Guild. The following year he unveiled his "Damascus knives" at the Guild Show and created a revival of interest in the forged blade, and along with the knives he gave away free booklets detailing how he made them, to encourage other knifemakers to take up the hammer and anvil. In 1976 he founded the American Bladesmith Society (ABS). Despite its name, this was an international group of knife makers dedicated to preserving the forged blade and educating the public about traditional bladesmithing techniques. The handful of traditional bladesmiths in the 1960s rose to several hundred by 2005.

=== Tools ===
The basic art and principles of forging a blade has remained similar for thousands of years and the modern bladesmith uses a variety of tools and techniques in order to produce a blade. Forges formerly fed by wood, coke, or coal are still in use, but gas forges are becoming the standard. Likewise the smith's hammer is being eclipsed by the use of hydraulic forging presses and power hammers.

=== Steel ===
Modern bladesmiths use a variety of steels to produce their blades, most commonly high carbon steel, such as SAE 1075 or SAE 1095 (the '10' representing the 10-series carbon steels, while '75' '85' and '95' reflect the carbon content of the steel), tool steel such as O-1, A-2, D2 other tool or high-carbon steels, or a variety of steels welded in layers, commonly referred to as "Damascus".

When forging, the blade material is heated to a high temperature or forging temperature in a forge and shaped with a hammer on an anvil to achieve the desired shape, often to near final dimension, where very little stock removal, if any, is required to finish. Steel can be folded either to form decorative pattern welded steel or to refine raw steel, or as the Japanese call it, tamahagane. Grain size is kept at a minimum as grain growth can happen quite easily if the blade material is overheated.

Swords and longer blades, in modern times, are often crafted of 5160 carbon spring steel, which is not as hard or brittle as a high-carbon steel (such as 1095), but is more durable and less prone to breakage, and therefore more suitable for longer weapons. 5160 carbon spring steel is sometimes used for leaf springs in American trucks, making it readily available in the US. In Europe, EN-45 is more commonly used.

==== Damascus steel ====
Many bladesmiths are able to forge a special type of steel using a technique called pattern welding, producing a metal erroneously referred to as Damascus steel. Modern pattern-welded steel can be highly decorative as well as durable (if welded in certain ways with proper steels), and is often used in custom knife- and sword-crafting. Bill Moran is said to be the "Father of Modern Damascus Steel". Gocha Laghidze is a bladesmith known for the reintroduction of 'Georgian Damascus steel'.

== See also ==
- Sword replica
- Knifesmith
- Metalsmith
- Kris
- Sharpening
- Sword making
- Japanese swordsmithing
- Maraging steel for fencing blades – highly breakage resistant, very good for pointed weapons, not good for edged
