= Damascus steel =

Type of steel used in Middle Eastern swordmaking

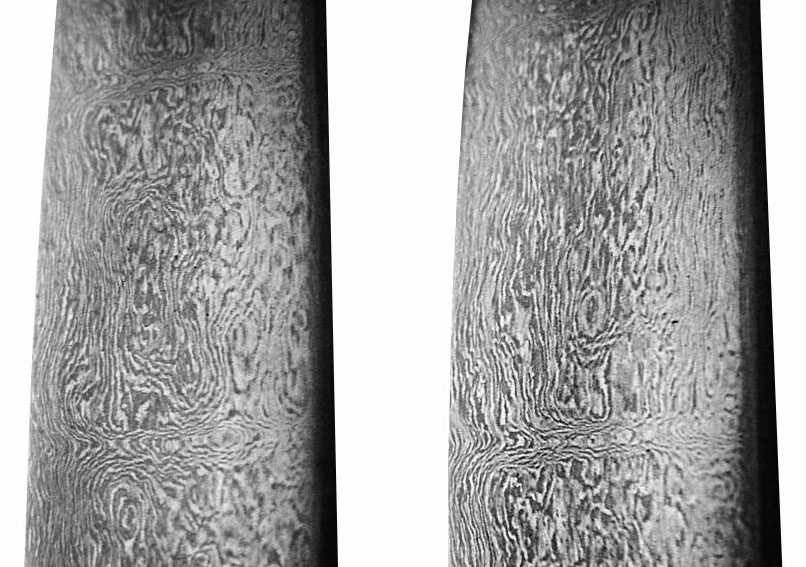
Close-up of a 13th-century Persian-forged Damascus steel sword

Damascus steel (Arabic: فولاذ دمشقي, romanized: fūlāḏ Damašqiyy) is the high-carbon crucible steel of the blades of historical swords forged using the wootz process in the Near East, characterized by distinctive patterns of banding and mottling reminiscent of flowing water, sometimes in a "ladder" or "rose" pattern. Damascus steel was reputed to be tough, resistant to shattering, and capable of being honed to a sharp, resilient edge. This is not to be confused with damascene, which is a form of metal inlaying.

Originally, it came from India and Sri Lanka, where the steel-making techniques used were first developed. Arabic adopted the word for steel from pre-New Persian pōlād.

The term "Damascus steel" is rooted in the medieval city of Damascus, perhaps as an early example of branding. However, there is now a general agreement that many of the swords, or at least the steel ingots from which they were forged, were imported from elsewhere.

== Naming ==
The origin of the name "Damascus steel" is contentious. Islamic scholars al-Kindi (circa 800 CE – 873 CE) and al-Biruni (circa 973 CE – 1048 CE) both wrote about swords and steel made for swords, based on their surface appearance, geographical location of production or forging, or the name of the smith. Each mentions "damascene" or "damascus" swords to some extent.

Drawing from al-Kindi and al-Biruni, there are three potential sources for the term "Damascus" in the context of steel:

- The word "damas" is the root word for "watered" in Arabic with "water" being "ma" in Arabic and Damascus blades are often described as exhibiting a water-pattern on their surface, and are often referred to as "watered steel" in multiple languages.
- Al-Kindi called swords produced and forged in Damascus as Damascene, but these swords were not described as having a pattern in the steel.
- Al-Biruni mentions a sword-smith called Damasqui who made swords of crucible steel.

The most common explanation is that steel is named after Damascus, the capital city of Syria and one of the largest cities in the ancient Levant. In Damascus, where many of these swords were sold, there is no evidence of local production of crucible steel, though there is evidence of imported steel being forged into swords in Damascus. The name could have been an early form of branding.

"Damascus steel" may either refer to swords made or sold in Damascus directly, or simply those with the distinctive surface patterns on the swords, in the same way that Damask fabrics (also named for Damascus), got their name.

== History ==
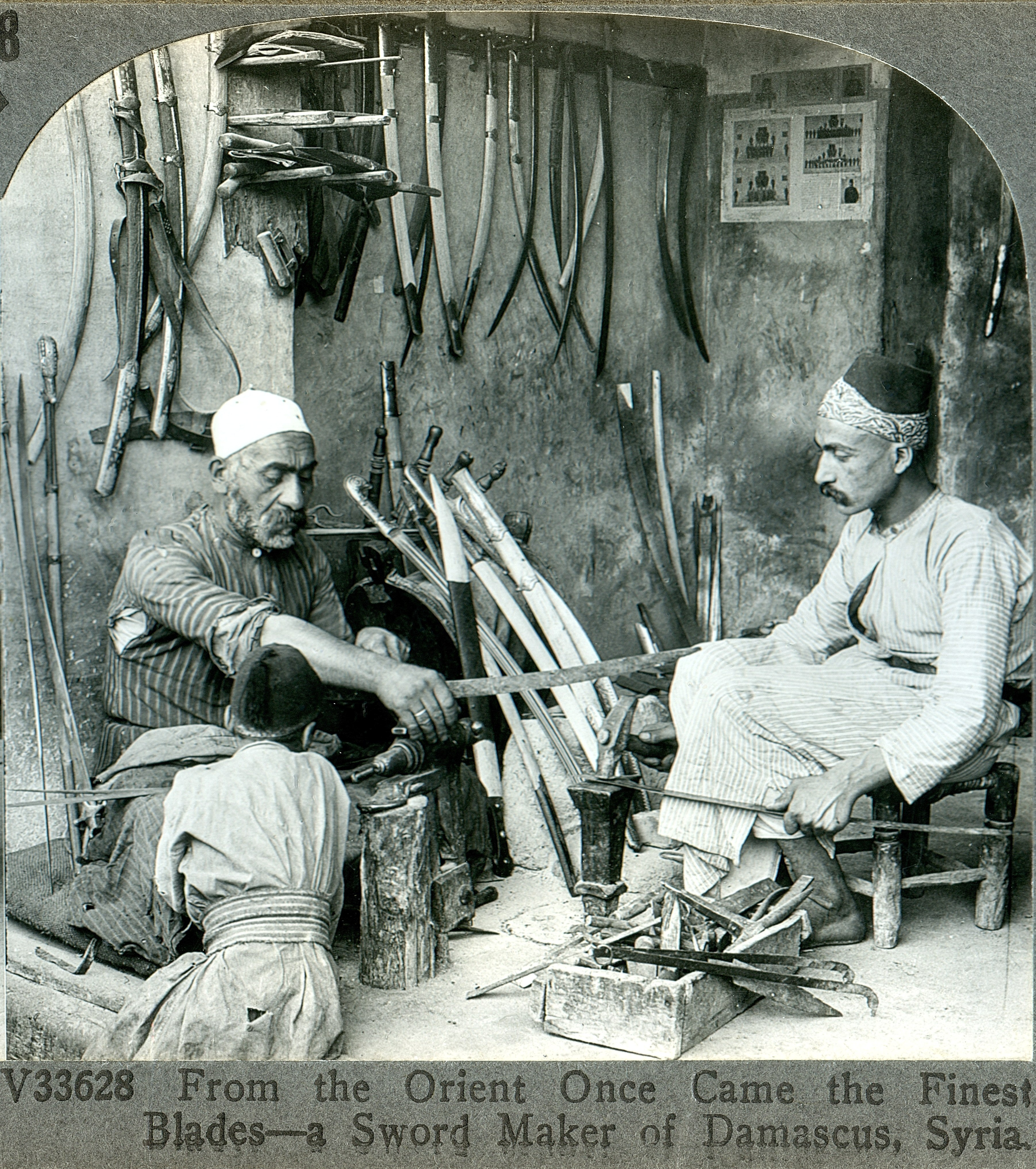
A bladesmith from Damascus, c. 1900

Damascus blades were first manufactured in the Near East from ingots of wootz steel that were imported from Southern India (present-day Telangana, Tamil Nadu, Karnataka and Kerala). Al-Kindi states that crucible steel was also made in Khorasan known as Muharrar, in addition to steel that was imported. There was also domestic production of crucible steel outside of India, including Merv (Turkmenistan) and Yazd, Iran.

In addition to being made into blades in India (particularly Golconda) and Sri Lanka, wootz / ukku was exported as ingots to various production centers, including Khorasan, and Isfahan, where the steel was used to produce blades, as well as across the Middle East.

The Arabs introduced the wootz steel to Damascus, where a weapons industry thrived. From the 3rd century to the 17th century, steel ingots were being shipped to the Middle East from South India.

Bin iron, which is produced by the Western Barbarians [Xi Fan 西番], is especially fine. The Bao zang lun states: 'There are five kinds of iron ... [The first two come from Hubei and Jiangxi.] Bin iron is produced in Persia [Bosi 波斯]; it is so hard and sharp that it can cut gold and jade ... [The last two kinds come from Shanxi and the Southwest.]

— Li Shizhen

== Legends ==
The reputation and history of Damascus steel have given rise to many legends, such as the ability to cut through a bar of iron without harming the edge, and of swords made of the related wootz steel; it was said that they could cut a wisp of silk floss falling across the blade.

The blade that Beowulf used to kill Grendel's mother in the story Beowulf was described in some Modern English translations as "damascened". Although this could also refer to a form of metal decoration known as damascene.

It was previously incorrectly believed that the steel was hardened by thrusting it six times into the back and thighs of an enslaved person. The misconception originated in an article in the November 4, 1894 issue of the Chicago Tribune titled Tempering Damascus Blades. The note asserts that a certain "Prof. von Eulenspiegel" found a scroll "among the ruins of ancient Tyre"; "Eulenspiegel" is the name of a legendary prankster of medieval Germany.

== Material and mechanical properties ==
O. M. Becker, writing on steel used for tool-making, claimed in 1910 that ancient Damascus alloys remained unequaled even in his own time in terms of tempering quality. He mentions, however, that modern electric steel is said to outperform crucible steel, a category which includes Damascus steel. The production process of Damascus steel and the traces of elements such as tungsten, nickel and manganese found in it, which are also used in modern high-speed varieties, made the blades very flexible and very hard at the same time, extraordinary qualities considering their age. In fact, extant examples of patterned crucible steel swords were often tempered in such a way as to retain a bend after being flexed past their elastic limit.

Verhoeven, Peterson, and Baker completed mechanical characterization of a Damascus sword, performing tensile testing as well as hardness testing. They found that the Damascus steel was somewhat comparable to hot-rolled steel bars with 1.0 wt% carbon with regards to mechanical properties. The average yield strength of 740 MPa was higher than the hot-rolled steel yield strength of 550 MPa, and the average tensile strength of 1070 MPa was higher than the hot-rolled steel tensile strength of 965 MPa.

These results are likely due to the finer pearlite spacing in the Damascus steel, refining the microstructure. The elongation and reduction in area were also slightly higher than the averages for hot-rolled steel. Rockwell hardness measurements of the Damascus steel ranged from 62 to 67. These mechanical properties were consistent with those expected for the material's constituent steels, falling between the upper and lower bounds set by the original steels.

=== Folding ===
Another study investigated the properties of Damascus steel produced from 1075 steel and 15N20 steel, which have approximately equal carbon content, but 15N20 steel notably contains 2 wt% nickel. The 1075 steel is known for high strength, but low toughness, with a pearlitic microstructure, and the 15N20 steel is known for high toughness with a ferritic microstructure. The mechanical properties of the resultant Damascus steel laminate were characterized in samples with 54 folds in production, as well as samples with 250 folds.

Charpy V-notch impact tests showed that the 54-fold samples had an impact toughness of 4.36 J/cm^{2}, while the 250-fold samples had an impact toughness of 5.49 J/cm^{2}. Tensile testing showed that the yield strengths and elongations of both samples were similar, at approximately 475 MPa and 3.2%, respectively. However, the maximum strength of the 54-fold samples was notably lower than that of the 250-fold samples (750 MPa vs. 860 MPa). This study showed that the folding process significantly affects the mechanical properties of the steel, with toughness increasing as the number of folds increases. This effect is likely due to the thinning and refinement of the microstructure, and to achieve optimal properties, the steel should be folded a few hundred times.

Further studies of Damascus steel made from other steels showed similar results, confirming that increasing the number of folds increases impact strength and toughness, and that this effect extends to higher temperatures. They also compare the mechanical properties of the Damascus to the original materials, finding that the properties of the Damascus steel lie between those of the two constituent steels, which is consistent with composite material properties.

=== Lamination and banding ===
The processing and design of the laminations and bands can also significantly affect mechanical properties. Regardless of tempering temperature and the liquid in which the steel is quenched, the impact strength of Damascus steel, when the impact is perpendicular to the band orientation, is significantly higher than when the impact is parallel to the band orientation.

This is due to the failure and fracture mechanisms in Damascus steel, where cracks propagate fastest along the interfaces between the two constituent steels. When impact is directed parallel to the bands, cracks can propagate easily along the lamination interfaces. When impact is directed perpendicular to the bands, the lamination interfaces are effectively protected, deflecting the cracks and increasing the energy required for cracks to propagate through the material. Band orientation should be chosen to protect against deformation and increase toughness.

== Metallurgical process ==
Identification of crucible "Damascus" steel based on metallurgical structures is difficult, as crucible steel cannot be reliably distinguished from other types of steel by just one criterion, so the following distinguishing characteristics of crucible steel must be taken into consideration:

- The crucible steel was liquid, leading to a relatively homogeneous steel content with virtually no slag
- The formation of dendrites is a typical characteristic
- The segregation of elements into dendritic and interdendritic regions throughout the sample

By these definitions, modern recreations of crucible steel are consistent with historic examples.

Bin iron: It is produced by the Western Barbarians. Some [types] have a spiral self-patterning, while others have a sesame-seed or snowflake patterning. When a knife or sword is wiped clean and treated with 'gold thread' alum, [the pattern] appears. Its value is greater than silver.

— Cao Zhao

=== Addition of carbon ===
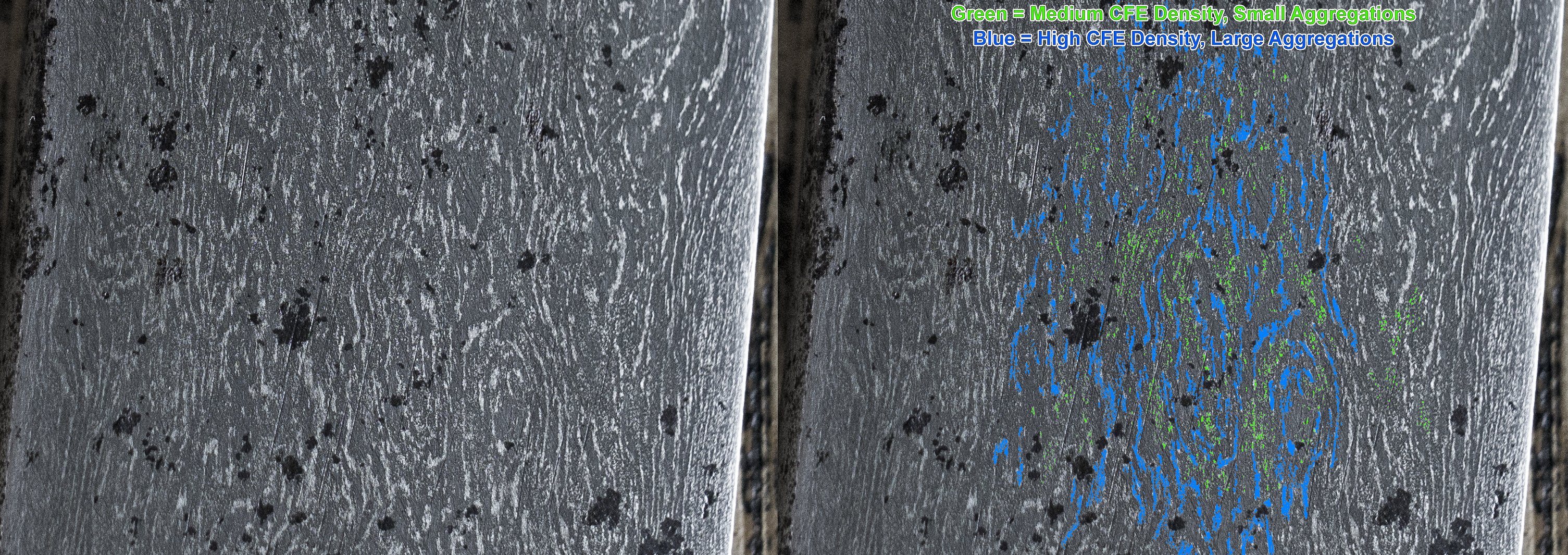
Macroscopic section of crucible steel (left) and false color labeling (right) showing rafts rich in carbide-forming elements (CFEs), which lead to clustered cementite spheroids, as well as divorced cementite spheroids.

During the smelting process to obtain wootz steel ingots, woody biomass and leaves are known to have been used as carburizing additives along with certain specific types of iron rich in microalloying elements. These ingots would then be further forged and worked into Damascus steel blades. Research now shows that carbon nanotubes can be derived from plant fibers, suggesting how the nanotubes were formed in the steel. Some experts expect to discover such nanotubes in more relics as they are analyzed more closely.

Wootz was also mentioned to have been made out of a co-fusion process using "shaburqan" (hard steel, likely white cast iron) and "narmahan" (soft steel) by Biruni, both of which were forms of either high- and low-carbon bloomery iron, or low-carbon bloom with cast iron. In such a crucible recipe, no added plant material is necessary to provide the required carbon content, and as such any nanowires of cementite or carbon nanotubes would not have been the result of plant fibers.

=== Modern research ===
A research team in Germany published a report in 2006 revealing nanowires and carbon nanotubes in a blade forged from Damascus steel, although John Verhoeven of Iowa State University in Ames suggests that the research team that reported nanowires in crucible steel was seeing cementite, which can itself exist as rods, so there might not be any carbon nanotubes in the rod-like structure.

== Loss of the technique ==
Production of these patterned swords gradually declined, ceasing by around 1900, with the last account being from 1903 in Sri Lanka documented by Coomaraswamy. Some gunsmiths during the 18th and 19th century used the term "damascus steel" to describe their pattern-welded gun barrels, but they did not use crucible steel. Several modern theories have ventured to explain this decline:

- Due to the distance of trade for this steel, a sufficiently lengthy disruption of the trade routes could have ended the production of Damascus steel and eventually led to the loss of the technique.
- Key trace impurities of carbide formers such as tungsten, vanadium, or manganese within the materials needed for the production of the steel may be absent if this material was acquired from different production regions or smelted from ores lacking these key trace elements.
- The technique for controlled thermal cycling after the initial forging at a specific temperature could also have been lost, thereby preventing the final damask pattern in the steel from occurring.
- The disruption of mining and steel manufacture by the British Raj in the form of production taxes and export bans may have also contributed to a loss of knowledge of key ore sources or key techniques.

=== Modern conjecture ===
The discovery of alleged carbon nanotubes in the Damascus steel's composition, if true, could support the hypothesis that wootz production was halted due to a loss of ore sources or technical knowledge, since the precipitation of carbon nanotubes probably resulted from a specific process that may be difficult to replicate should the production technique or raw materials used be significantly altered. The claim that carbon nanowires were found has not been confirmed by further studies, and there is contention among academics about whether the nanowires observed are actually stretched rafts or rods formed out of cementite spheroids.

Modern attempts to duplicate the metal have not always been entirely successful due to differences in raw materials and manufacturing techniques, but several individuals have successfully produced pattern-forming hypereutectoid crucible steel with visible carbide banding on the surface, consistent with original Damascus steel.

== Modern reproduction ==
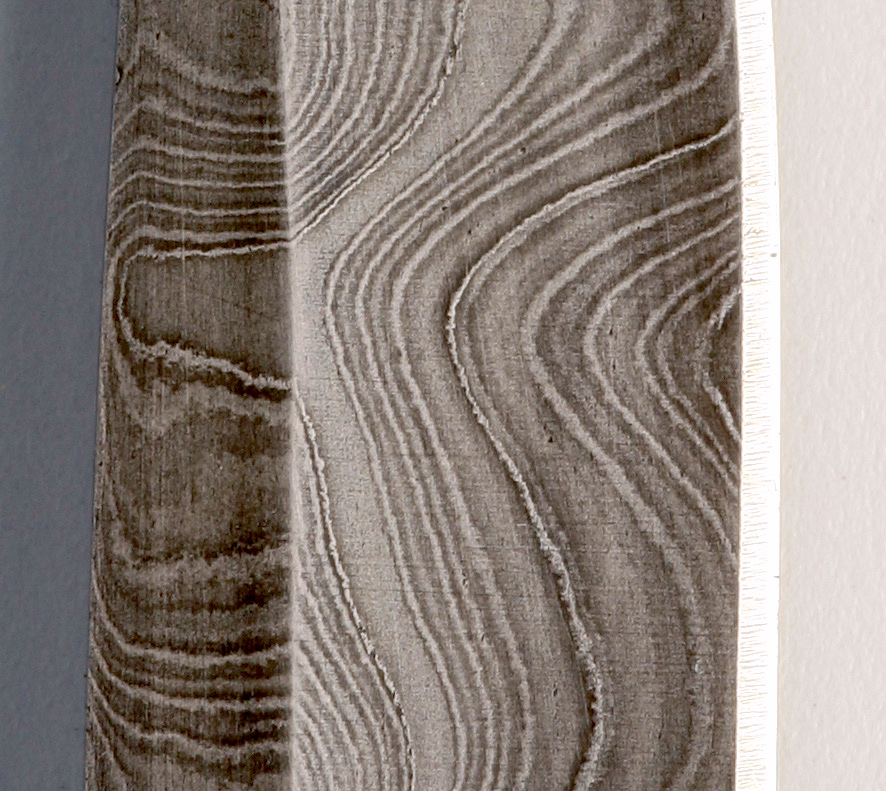
Pattern on a modern "Damascus knife" produced in Germany.

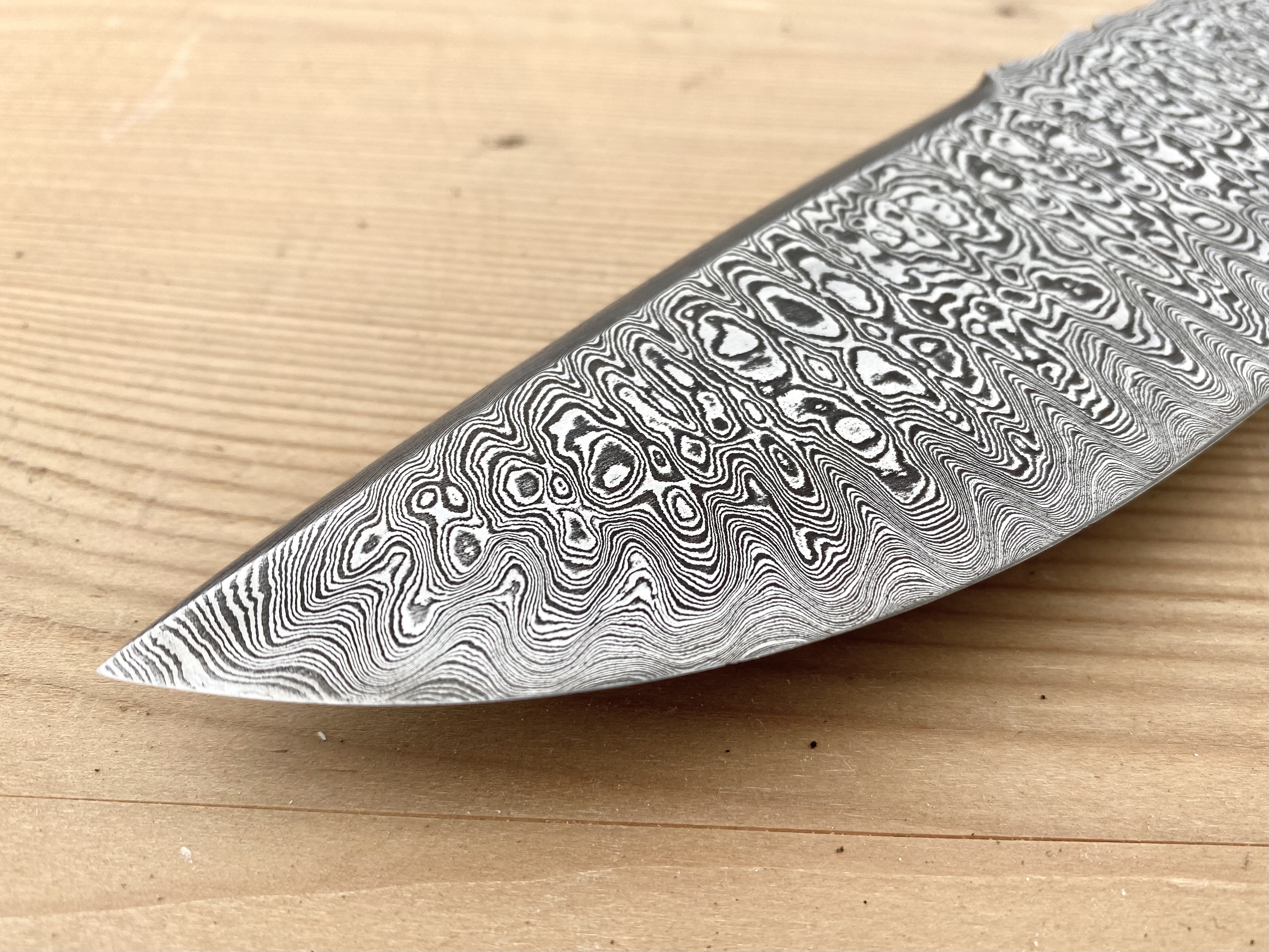
Up close pattern on a modern "Damascus knife"

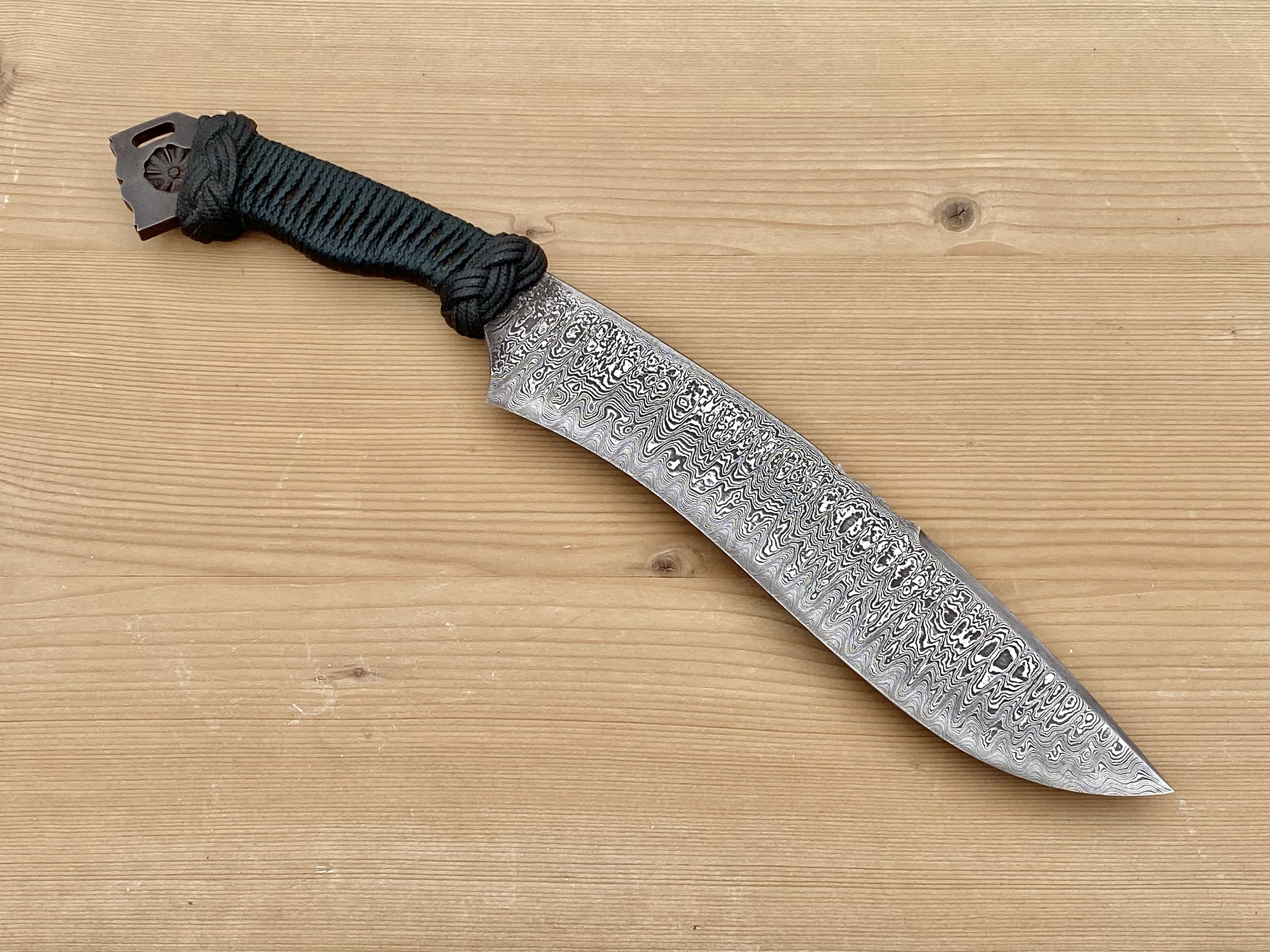
A modern "Damascus knife"

Recreating Damascus steel has been attempted by archaeologists using experimental archaeology. Many have attempted to discover or reverse-engineer the process by which it was made.

=== Moran: billet welding ===
Since the well-known technique of pattern welding—the forge-welding of a blade from several differing pieces—produced surface patterns similar to those found on Damascus blades, some modern blacksmiths were erroneously led to believe that the original Damascus blades were made using this technique. However, today, the difference between wootz steel and pattern welding is fully documented and well understood. Pattern-welded steel has been referred to as "Damascus steel" since 1973 when bladesmith William F. Moran unveiled his "Damascus knives" at the Knifemakers' Guild Show.

This "Modern Damascus" is made from several types of steel and iron slices welded together to form a billet, and currently, the term "Damascus" (although technically incorrect) is widely accepted to describe modern pattern-welded steel blades in the trade. The patterns vary depending on how the smith works the billet. The billet is drawn out and folded until the desired number of layers is formed. To attain a Master Smith rating with the American Bladesmith Society that Moran founded, the smith must forge a Damascus blade with a minimum of 300 layers.

=== Verhoeven and Pendray: crucible ===
J. D. Verhoeven and A. H. Pendray published an article on their attempts to reproduce the elemental, structural, and visual characteristics of Damascus steel. They started with a cake of steel that matched the properties of the original wootz steel from India, which also matched some original Damascus swords that Verhoeven and Pendray had access to.

The wootz was in a soft, annealed state, with a grain structure and beads of pure iron carbide in cementite spheroids, which resulted from its hypereutectoid state. Verhoeven and Pendray had already determined that the grains on the surface of the steel were grains of iron carbide—their goal was to reproduce the iron carbide patterns they saw in the Damascus blades from the grains in the wootz.

Although such material could be worked at low temperatures to produce the striated Damascene pattern of intermixed ferrite/pearlite and cementite spheroid bands in a manner identical to pattern-welded Damascus steel, any heat treatment sufficient to dissolve the carbides was thought to destroy the pattern permanently. However, Verhoeven and Pendray discovered that in samples of true Damascus steel, the Damascene pattern could be recovered by thermally cycling and thermally manipulating the steel at a moderate temperature.

They found that certain carbide-forming elements, including vanadium, did not disperse until the steel reached temperatures higher than those required to dissolve the carbides. Therefore, a high-heat treatment could remove the visual evidence of patterning associated with carbides, but did not remove the underlying patterning of the carbide-forming elements.

A subsequent lower-temperature heat treatment, at a temperature at which the carbides were again stable, could recover the structure by binding carbon with those elements, causing the segregation of cementite spheroids to those locations.

Thermal cycling after forging allows carbon to aggregate onto these carbide formers, as carbon migrates much more rapidly than the carbide formers. Progressive thermal cycling leads to the coarsening of the cementite spheroids via Ostwald ripening. An alternative form of pattern formation utilizing cementite/spheroidite banding was described in 2022 by the same researchers in conjunction with steelmaker Niko Hynninen.

=== Anosov, Wadsworth, and Sherby: Bulat ===
In Russia, chronicles record the use of a material known as bulat steel to make highly valued weapons, including swords, knives, and axes. Tsar Michael of Russia reportedly had a bulat helmet made for him in 1621. The exact origin or manufacturing process of the bulat is unknown. Still, it was likely imported to Russia via Persia and Turkestan and was similar to, and possibly identical to, Damascus steel. Pavel Petrovich Anosov successfully reproduced the process in the mid-19th century. Wadsworth and Sherby also researched bulat steel and published their results in 1980.

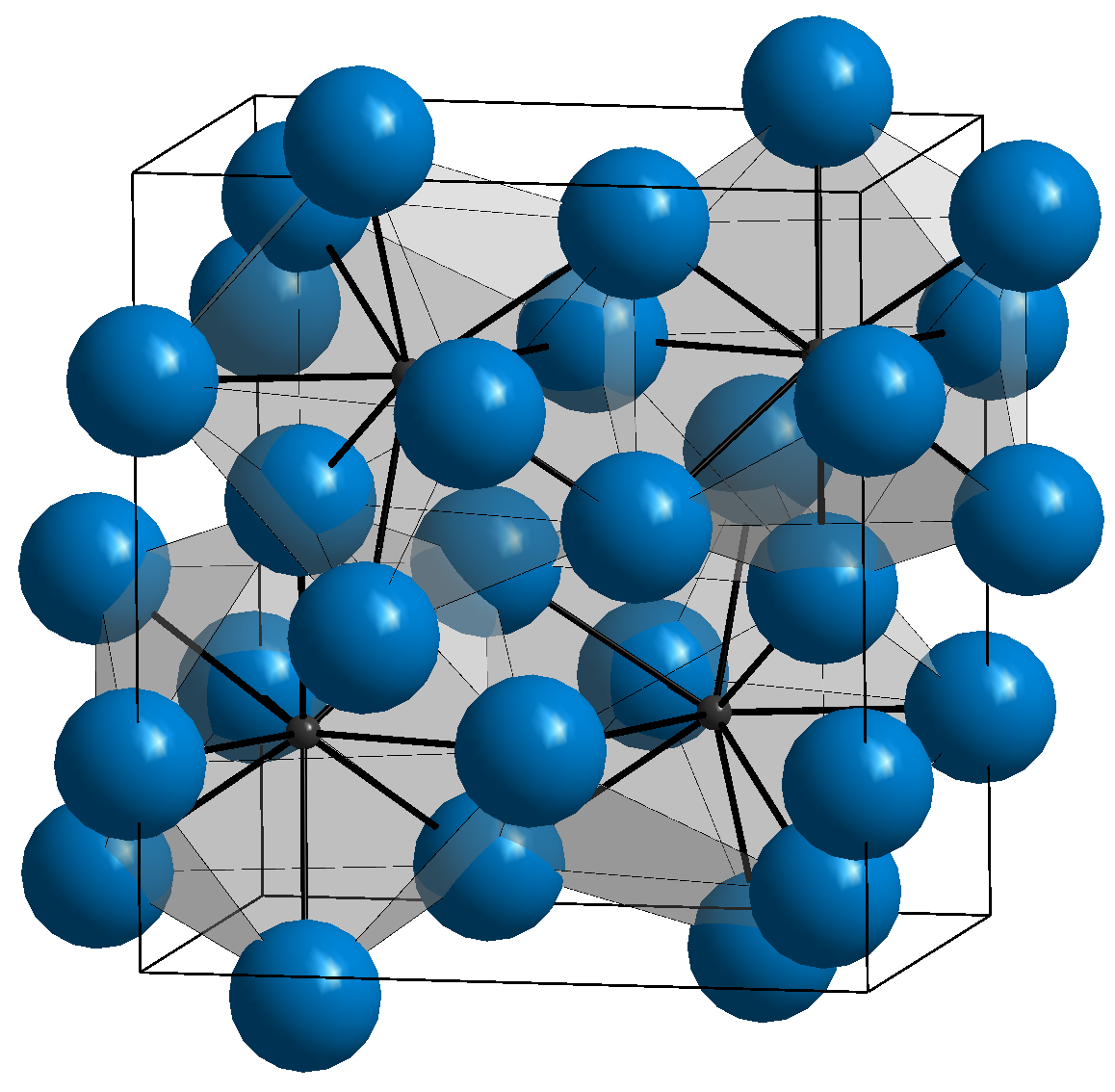
Cementite crystal structure. Iron atoms are in blue, carbon atoms are in black.

=== Additional research ===
A team of researchers based at the Technical University of Dresden that used x-rays and electron microscopy to examine Damascus steel discovered the presence of cementite nanowires and carbon nanotubes. Peter Paufler, a member of the Dresden team, says that these nanostructures are a result of the forging process.

Sanderson proposes that the process of forging and annealing accounts for the nano-scale structures.

German researchers have investigated the possibility of manufacturing high-strength Damascus steel using laser additive manufacturing techniques rather than traditional folding and forging. The resulting samples exhibited superior mechanical properties to ancient Damascus steels, with a tensile strength of 1300 MPa and 10% elongation.

=== In gun making ===
Before the early 20th century, all shotgun barrels were forged by heating narrow strips of iron and steel and shaping them around a mandrel. This process was referred to as "laminating" or "Damascus". These types of barrels earned a reputation for weakness and were never meant to be used with modern smokeless powder, or any moderately powerful explosive. Because of the resemblance to Damascus steel, higher-end barrels were made by Belgian and British gun makers. These barrels are proof marked and meant to be used with light-pressure loads. Current gun manufacturers make slide assemblies and small parts such as triggers and safeties for Colt M1911 pistols from powdered Swedish steel resulting in a swirling two-toned effect; these parts are often referred to as "stainless Damascus".

== See also ==
- Toledo steel
- Crucible steel
- Wootz steel
- Noric steel
- Bulat steel
- Tamahagane steel
- Mokume-gane
- Laminated steel blade
- List of lost inventions

== Sources ==
- Wagner, Donald B. (2008), Science and Civilization in China Volume 5-11: Ferrous Metallurgy, Cambridge University Press
