= Knife making =

Process of manufacturing a knife

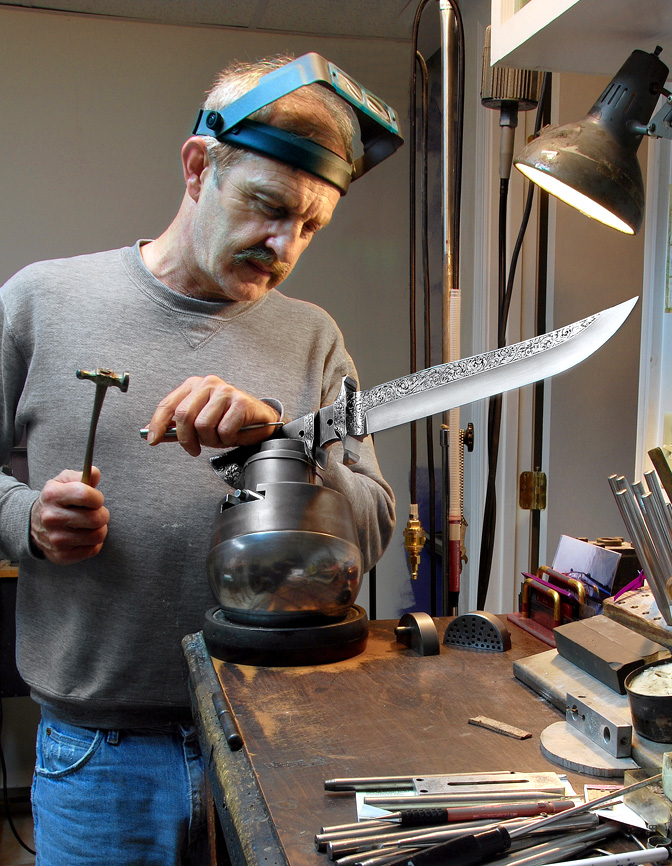
Engraving a knife

Knife making is the process of manufacturing a knife by any one or a combination of processes: stock removal, forging to shape, welded lamination or investment cast. Typical metals used come from the carbon steel, tool, or stainless steel families. Primitive knives have been made from bronze, copper, brass, iron, obsidian, and flint.

== Materials for blades ==
Different steels are suited to different applications. There is a trade off between hardness, toughness, edge retention, corrosion resistance, and achievable sharpness. Some examples of blade material and their relative trade offs:

- The newest powder metallurgy steels can be made very hard, but can quickly wear out abrasives and tooling.
- A blade made from low carbon or mild steel would be inexpensive to produce and of poor quality. A low carbon blade would be very hard to break, but would bend easily and be too soft to hold an edge. High carbon (or high alloy, in some listings) can take a much higher hardness but must be tempered carefully after heat treatment to avoid brittleness.

Unusual non-metallic materials may also be used; manufacturing techniques are quite different from metal:

- The natural volcanic glass obsidian can achieve a nearly molecular edge (high achievable sharpness) and only requires Stone Age technology to work, but is so brittle that it cannot maintain that sharpness for very long. Additionally, the entire blade is highly susceptible to being accidentally broken. One such use of obsidian is to make extremely sharp surgical scalpels.
- Ceramic knives hold their edge for a long time, but are brittle.

== Blade forging ==
=== Initial forging ===
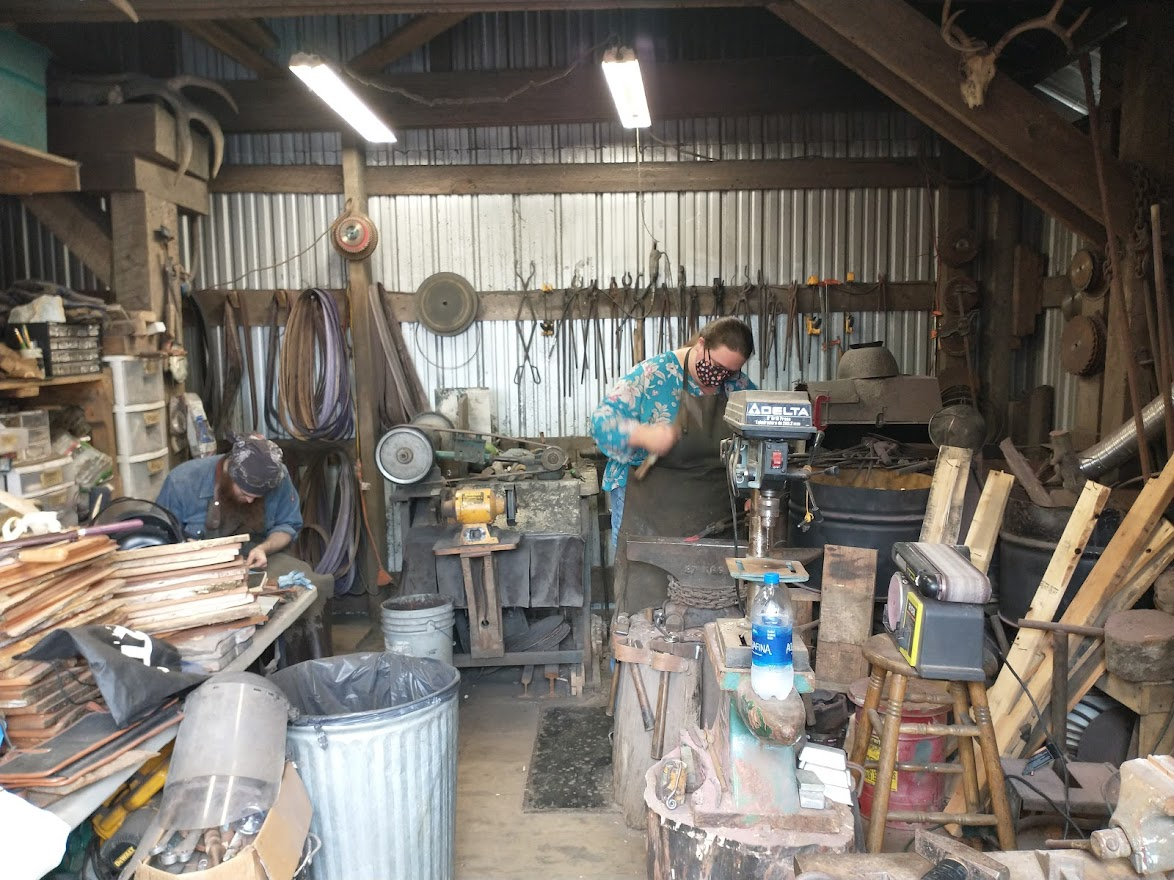
A blacksmith shop in Ketchikan, Alaska specializing in knife making.

The initial shaping of a knife is traditionally done through forging though stock removal or blanking can be used. Steel can be folded either to form decorative pattern welded steel or to refine raw steel, or as the Japanese call it, tamahagane. Grain size is kept at a minimum as grain growth can happen quite easily if the blade material is overheated.

In a mass production environment, or in a well equipped private shop, the blanking process is used to make "blade blanks." This can be achieved by a number of different methods, depending upon the thickness of the material and the alloy content of steel to be cut. Thinner cross section, lower alloy blanks can be stamped from sheet material. Materials that are more difficult to work with, or jobs that require higher production volume, can be accomplished with water jet cutters, lasers or electron beam cutting. These two lend themselves towards larger custom shops.

Knife makers will sometimes contract out to a shop with the above capabilities to do blanking. For lower production makers, or lower budgets, other methods must suffice. Knife makers may use many different methods to profile a blank. These can include hacksaws, files, belt grinders, wheel grinders, oxy-acetylene torches, CNC mills, bandsaws, or any number of other methods depending on budget.

=== Grinding ===
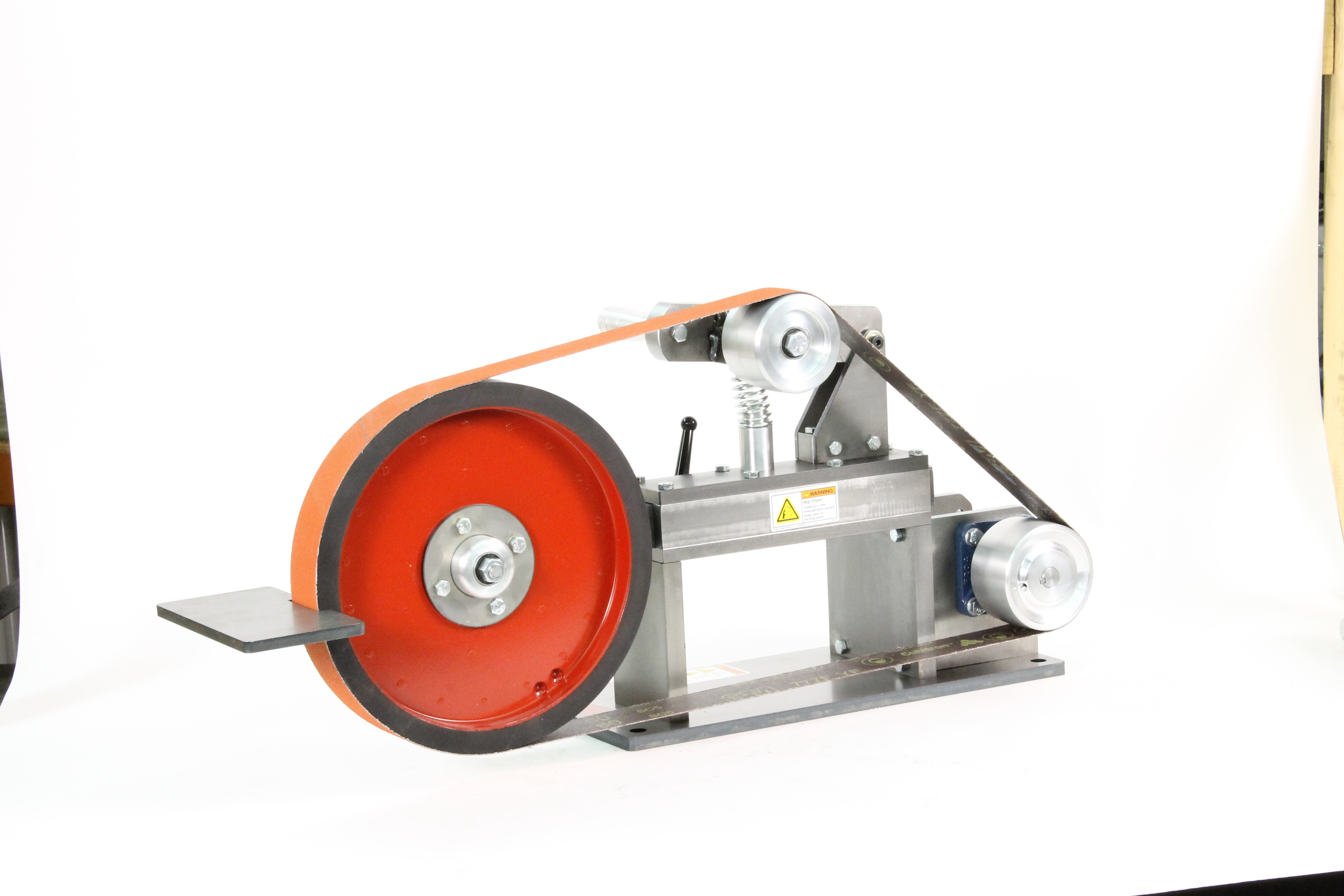
Belt grinder for knife making

If no power equipment is available, this can be done with files if the piece of steel has not yet been hardened. Grinding wheels, or small belt sanders are usually what a beginner uses. Well equipped makers usually use a large industrial belt grinder, or a belt grinder made specifically for knife making. The standard size for a knifemakers' belt grinder is a grinder that runs a belt size of 2" by 72". Pre-polish grinding on a heat treated blade can be done if the blade is kept cool, to preserve the temper of the steel. Overheating can be observed in the knife by watching for heat discoloration. Some knife makers will use a coolant mist on the grinder to achieve this.

=== Heat treatment ===
Methods of heat treatment: atmosphere furnace, molten salt, vacuum furnace, coal (coke) forge, oxy/acetylene torch. Quenching after heat treatment differs according to type of metal and personal preferences. Quenching can be done with oil, animal tallow, water, air, or brine. Most steels will require a specific temperature, soak time, and tempering heat for the different grades.

=== Blade finishes ===
The finish quality of the blade is determined by the Grit of the finishing grind. These can range from a low-shine 280-320 grit finish to a mirror-shine. The high polish shine can be accomplished by buffing with chrome oxide (ex. white chrome, green chrome), hand rubbing with extremely fine wet-or-dry abrasive paper, or with a Japanese water-stone, which has an approximate grit of 10,000-12,000. The knife might also have a different direction in scratch pattern, depending on the method of finishing.

== Flint knapping ==
Flint knapping is the action of chipping flakes of material off a larger stone typically flint or obsidian. This is repeated until the mass is reduced into the shape of a blade. Another technique of flint knapping to create a blade similarly is with one large hammer swing at the center of mass on a flat surface creating shards in a knife like shape. These shards are further worked using softer tools like deer antlers to chip of smaller flakes to further refine it into a sharp blade.

=== Obsidian knives ===
Obsidian knives made using the flint knapping technique are among the sharpest knives in the world. The use flint knapping to make obsidian knives dates back to 1,300 AD in the Aztec Empire for religious and decorative purposes. As of 2022 these knives are being adapted to replace scalpels in surgical practices, being sharper than even a No. 10 scalpel. Blades range from a couple inches in length up to 12 inches in length after the blade is fully sharpened.

=== Stone tools ===
The use of flint knapping to make stone tools including knives dates back 3 million years ago to make scraping tools. Flint knapping was also used to make spear and arrow heads 14,000 years ago.

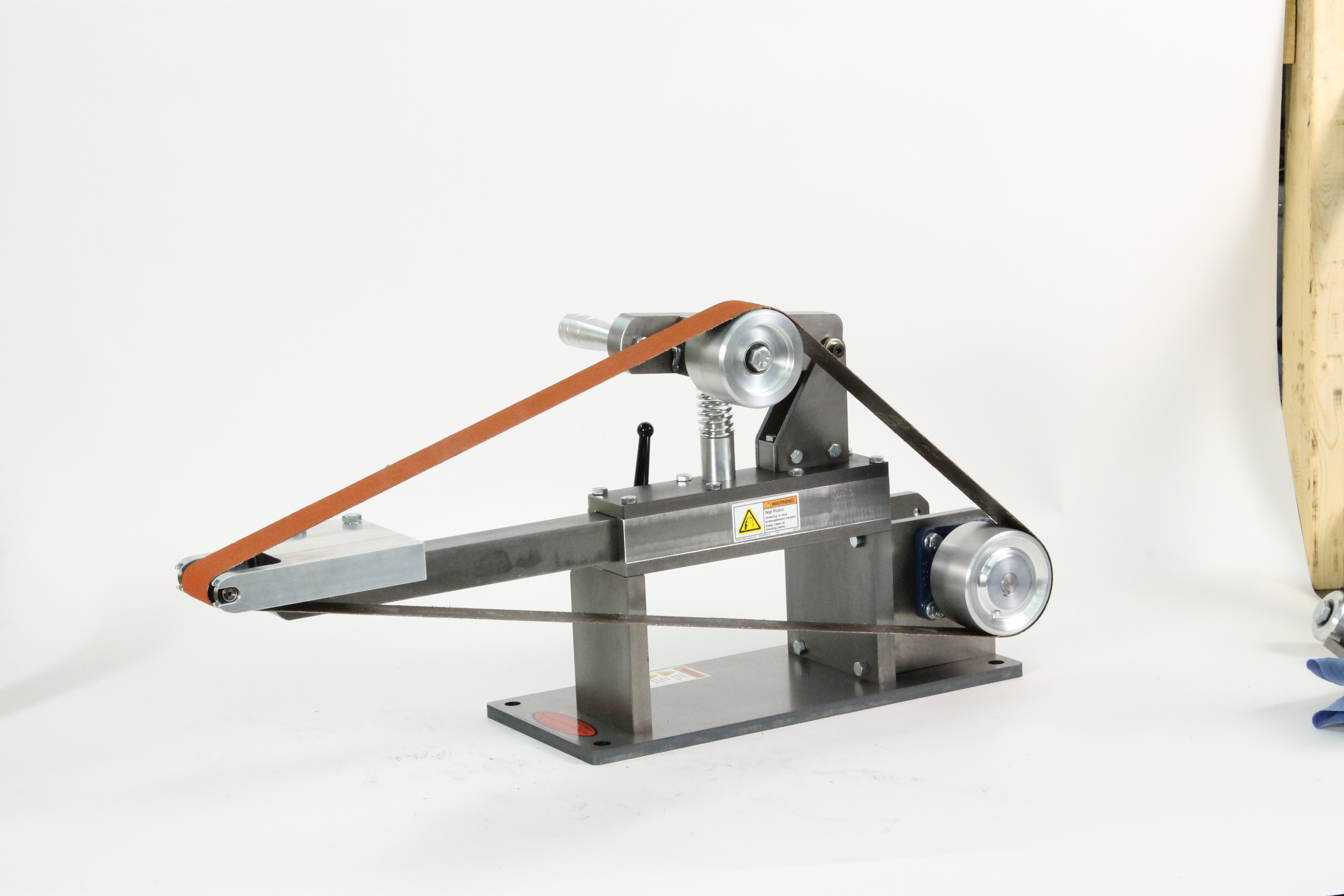
Attachment for small wheels used in making handles for knives.

== Handle making process ==
Handle making can be done in several different ways depending on the tang of the knife. Full tang knives usually have handle scales either pinned, riveted, or screwed on to the tang itself while knives without a full tang may be inserted into a solid handle and then attached in one of the previously stated methods. Handle materials can range from natural materials including wood or elk horn to man-made materials like brass, plastic, carbon fiber, polymer or micarta. A knife makers grinder may have additional attachments for making knife handles, such as small diameter contact wheels.
