= Stock removal =

Process of removing stock from a workpiece

Stock removal is the process of removing material (stock) from a workpiece. Stock removal processes include:

- Machining
- Milling
- Turning
- Drilling
- Grinding
- Filing
- Broaching
- Shaping
- Planing
- Sawing

Stock removal processes all fall under the umbrella of subtractive manufacturing, a more general term.
