= Japanese currency =

Japanese money

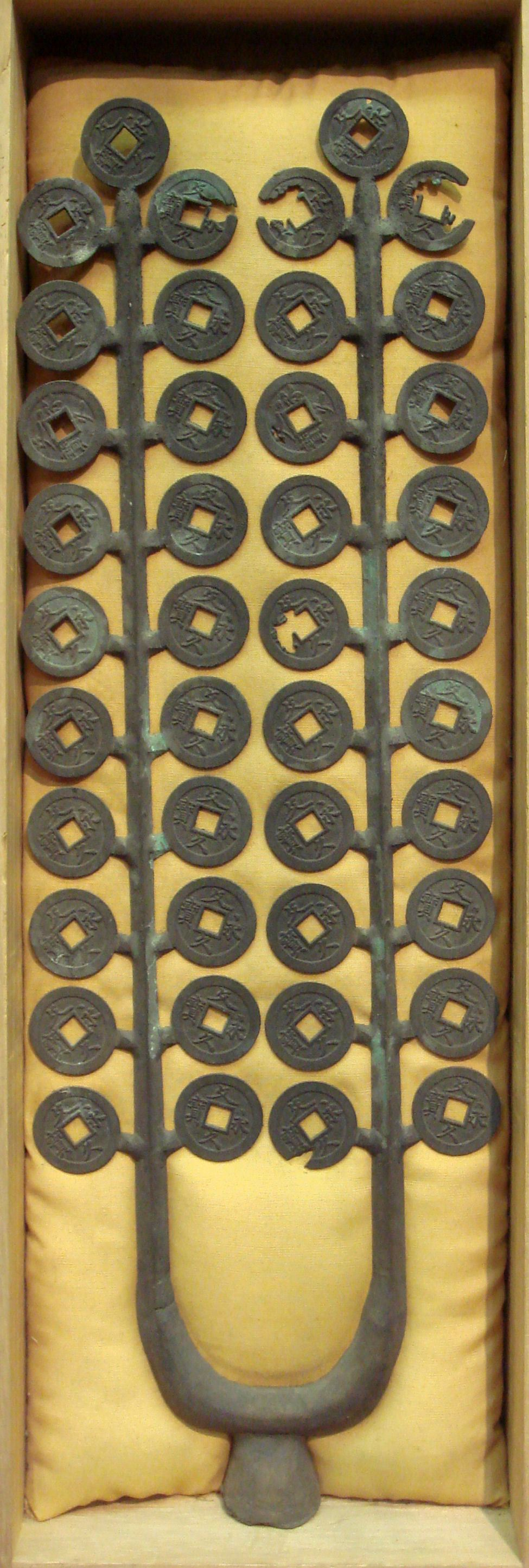
Kaei period Edasen ("Branch money"), the first result out of the foundry. The coins are then cut out and filed.

Japanese currency has a history covering the period from the 8th century CE to the present. After the traditional usage of rice as a currency medium, Japan adopted currency systems and designs from China before developing a separate system of its own.

== History ==
=== Commodity money ===
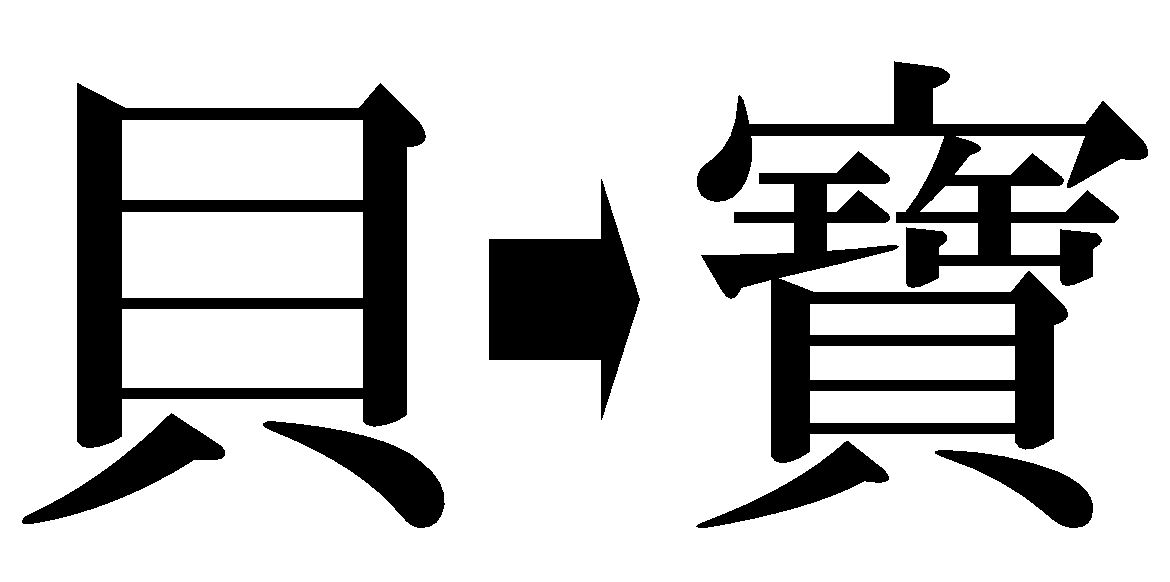
The ideogram for shell (貝) was incorporated into the ancient character for "coin"/ "treasure" (寶) Hō in Japanese (right).

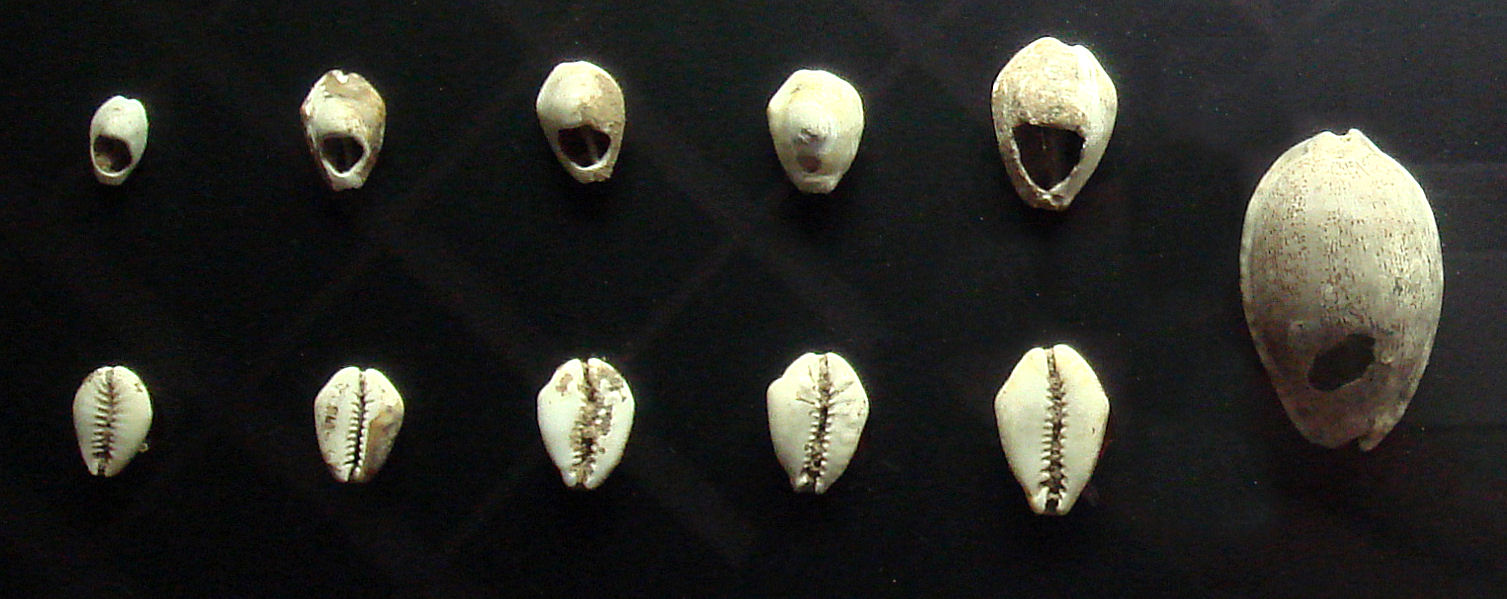
Chinese shell money, 16–8th century BCE

Before the 7th-8th centuries CE, Japan used commodity money for trading. This generally consisted of material that was compact and easily transportable and had a widely recognized value. Commodity money was a great improvement over simple barter, in which commodities were simply exchanged against others. Ideally, commodity money had to be widely accepted, easily portable and storable, and easily combined and divided in order to correspond to different values. The main items of commodity money in Japan were arrowheads, rice grains and gold powder.

This contrasted somewhat with countries like China, where one of the most important items of commodity money came from the southern seas: shells. Since then however, the shell has become a symbol for money in many Chinese and Japanese ideograms.

=== Early coinage ===
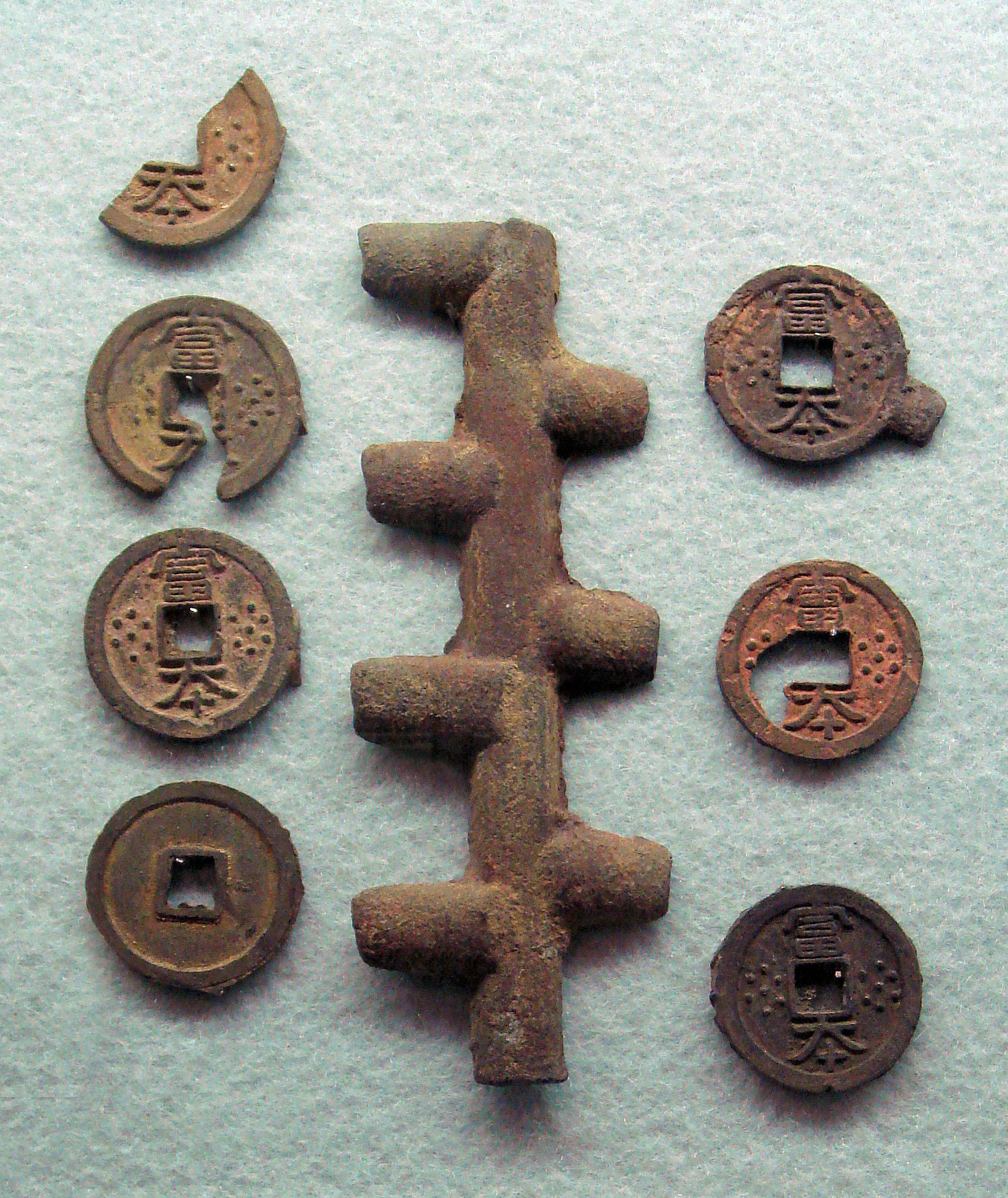
Fuhonsen (富本銭), found in Asukaike (飛鳥池), from the end of 7th century, are made from copper and antimony. They are examples of early Japanese minting and they are currently housed in the Japan Currency Museum.

The earliest coins to reach Japan were Chinese Ban Liang and Wu Zhu coins, as well as the coins produced by Wang Mang during the first centuries of the first millennium CE; these coins have been excavated all over Japan, but as Japan's economy was not sufficiently developed at the time, these coins were more likely to be used as precious objects rather than a means of exchange; rice and cloth served as the main currencies of Japan at the time.

The first coins produced in Japan are called the Mumonginsen (無文銀銭, or 'silver coins without inscription') and the copper alloy Fuhonsen (富本銭, coins made from an alloy of copper, lead and tin) which were all introduced in the late seventh century. These currencies (alongside other reforms) were based on the Chinese system and were therefore based on the Chinese units of measurement. In modern times the usage of Fuhonsen has often been interpreted as charms rather than currency, but it has recently been discovered that these copper coins were in fact the first government-made coinage of Japan.

=== Kōchōsen currency system (8th–10th centuries) ===
==== Embassy to the Tang court (630 CE) ====
Japan's first formal currency system was the Kōchōsen (Japanese: 皇朝銭, "Imperial currency"). It was exemplified by the adoption of Japan's first official coin type, the Wadōkaichin. It was first minted in 708 CE on the orders of Empress Genmei, Japan's 43rd Imperial ruler. "Wadō Kaichin" is the reading of the four characters printed on the coin, and is thought to be composed of the era name Wadō (和銅, "Japanese copper"), which could alternatively mean "happiness", and "Kaichin", thought to be related to "currency".

This coinage was inspired by the Tang coinage (唐銭) named Kaigen Tsūhō (Chinese: 開元通宝; pinyin: Kai Yuan Tong Bao), first minted in Chang'an in 621 CE. The Wadokaichin had the same specifications as the Chinese coin, with a diameter of 2.4 cm and a weight of 3.75g.

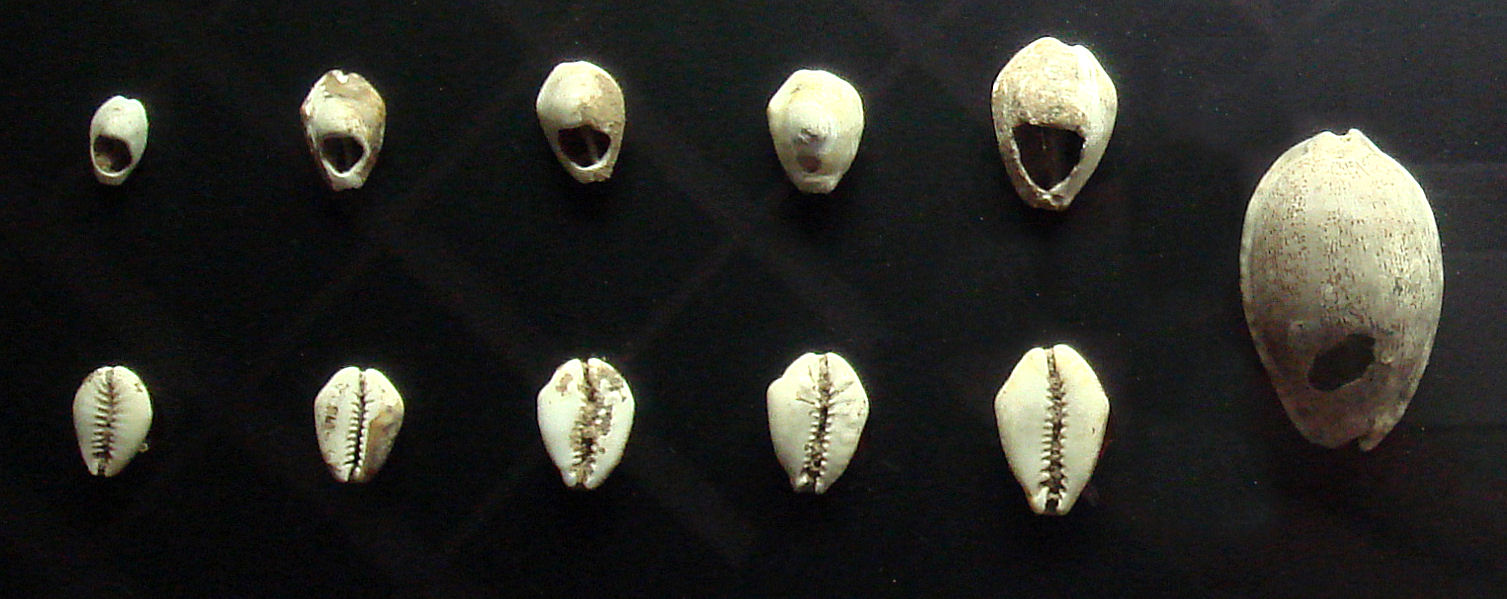
Chinese shell money was widely accepted, easy to carry, and easy to count.

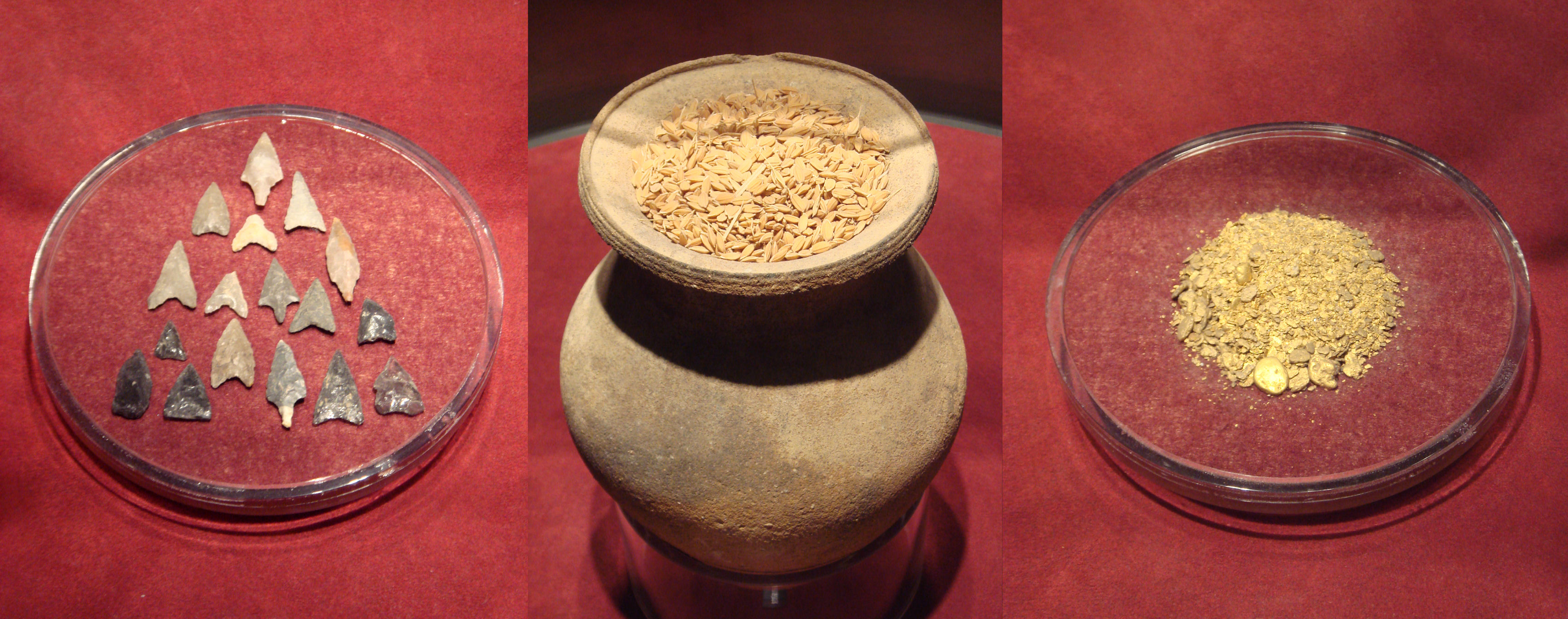
Japanese commodity money before the 8th century, including arrowheads, rice grains, and gold powder. Now in the Japanese Currency Museum

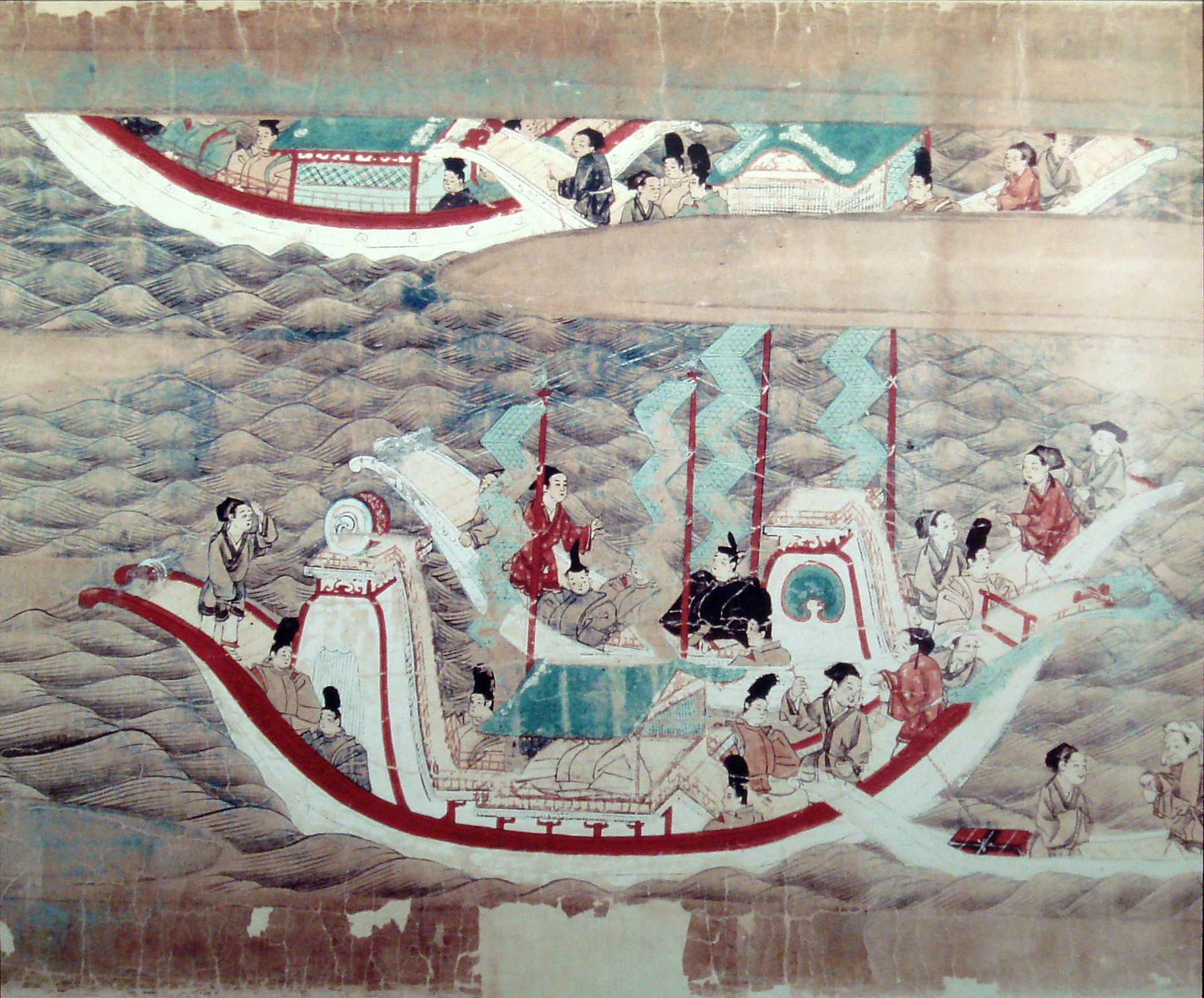
The Japanese embassy to the Tang court

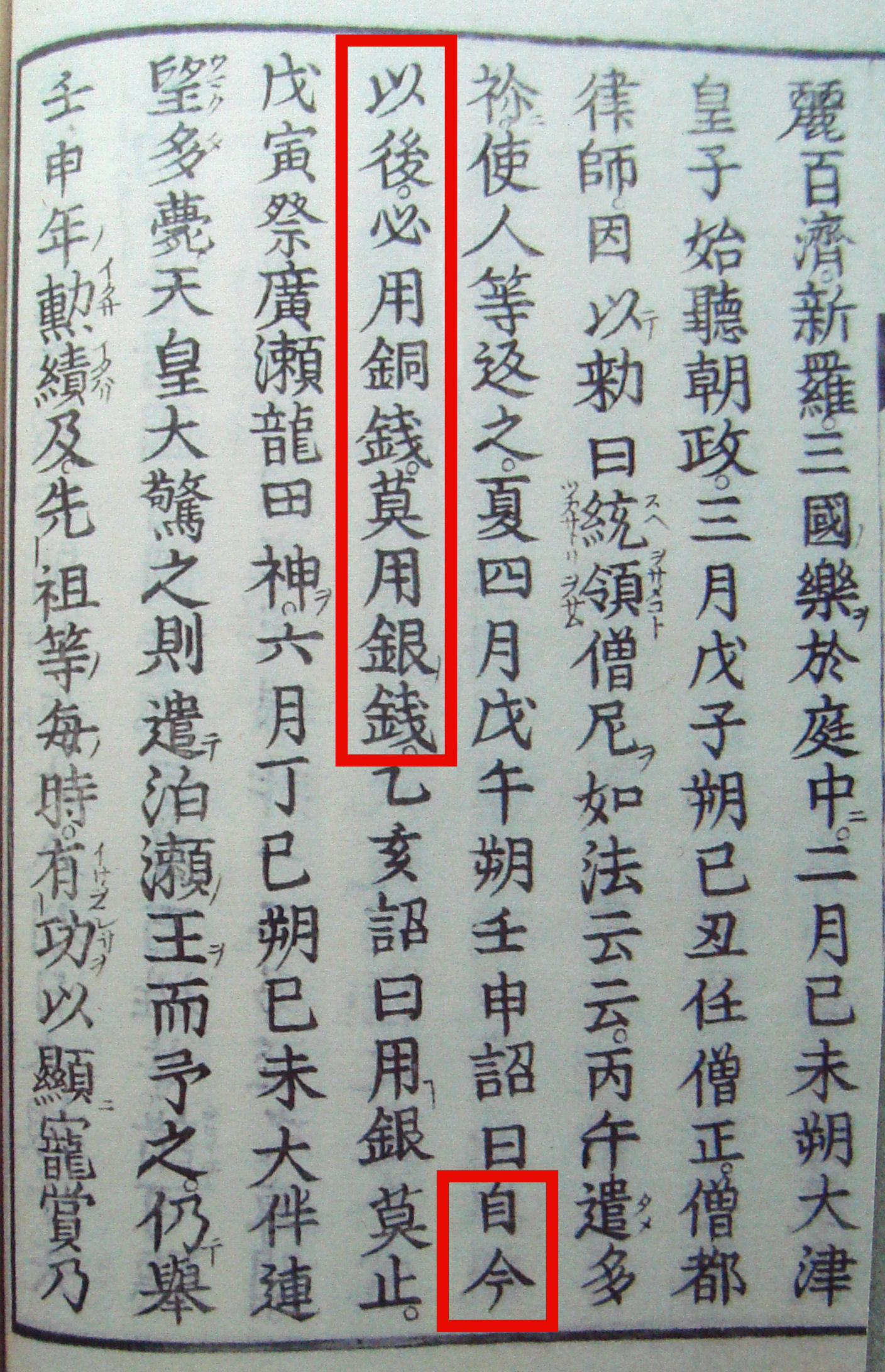
The Nihon Shoki entry of 15 April 683 (Tenmu 12th year) mandates the use of copper coins.

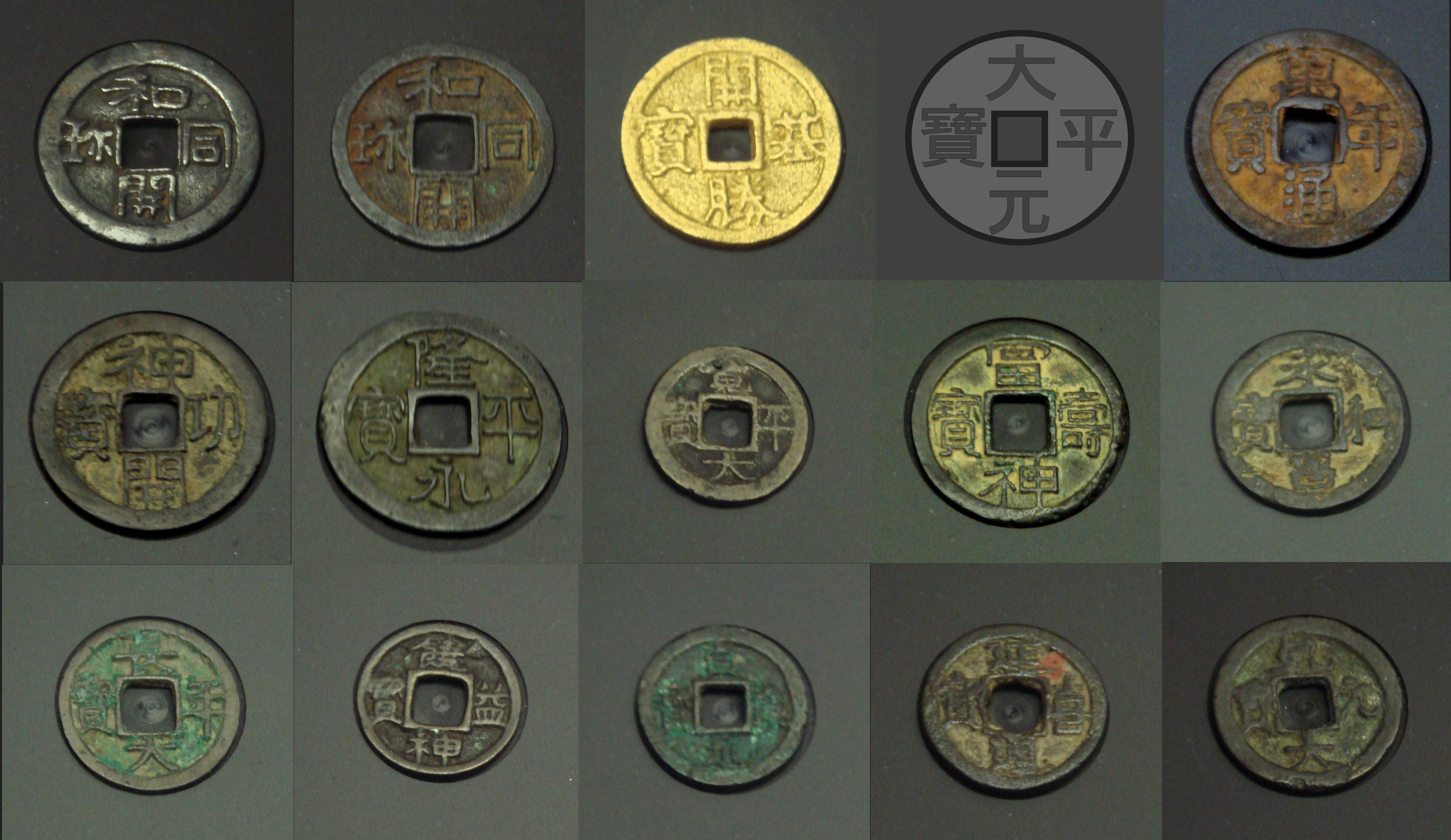
Known coin types of Japan from 708 to 958, chronologically arranged

Japan's contacts with China became intense during the Tang period, with many exchanges and cultural imports occurring. The first Japanese embassy to China is recorded to have been sent in 630. The importance of metallic currency appeared to Japanese nobles, probably leading to some coin minting at the end of the 7th century, such as the Fuhonsen coinage (富本銭), discovered in 1998 through archaeological research in Nara Prefecture. An entry of the Nihon Shoki dated April 15, 683 mentions: "From now on, copper coins should be used, but silver coins should not be used", which is thought to order the adoption of the Fuhonsen copper coins. The first official coinage was struck in 708.

==== Currency reform (760) ====
The Wadōkaichin soon became debased, as the government rapidly issued coins with progressively lesser metallic content, and local imitations thrived. In 760, a reform was put in place, in which a new copper coin called Man'nen Tsūhō (萬年通寳) was worth 10 times the value of the former Wadōkaichin, with also a new silver coin named Taihei Genpō (大平元寶) with a value of 10 copper coins, as well as a new gold coin named Kaiki Shoho (開基勝寶) with a value of 10 silver coins.

Silver minting was soon abandoned however, but copper minting took place throughout the Nara period. Twelve coin types are known, including one coin in gold.

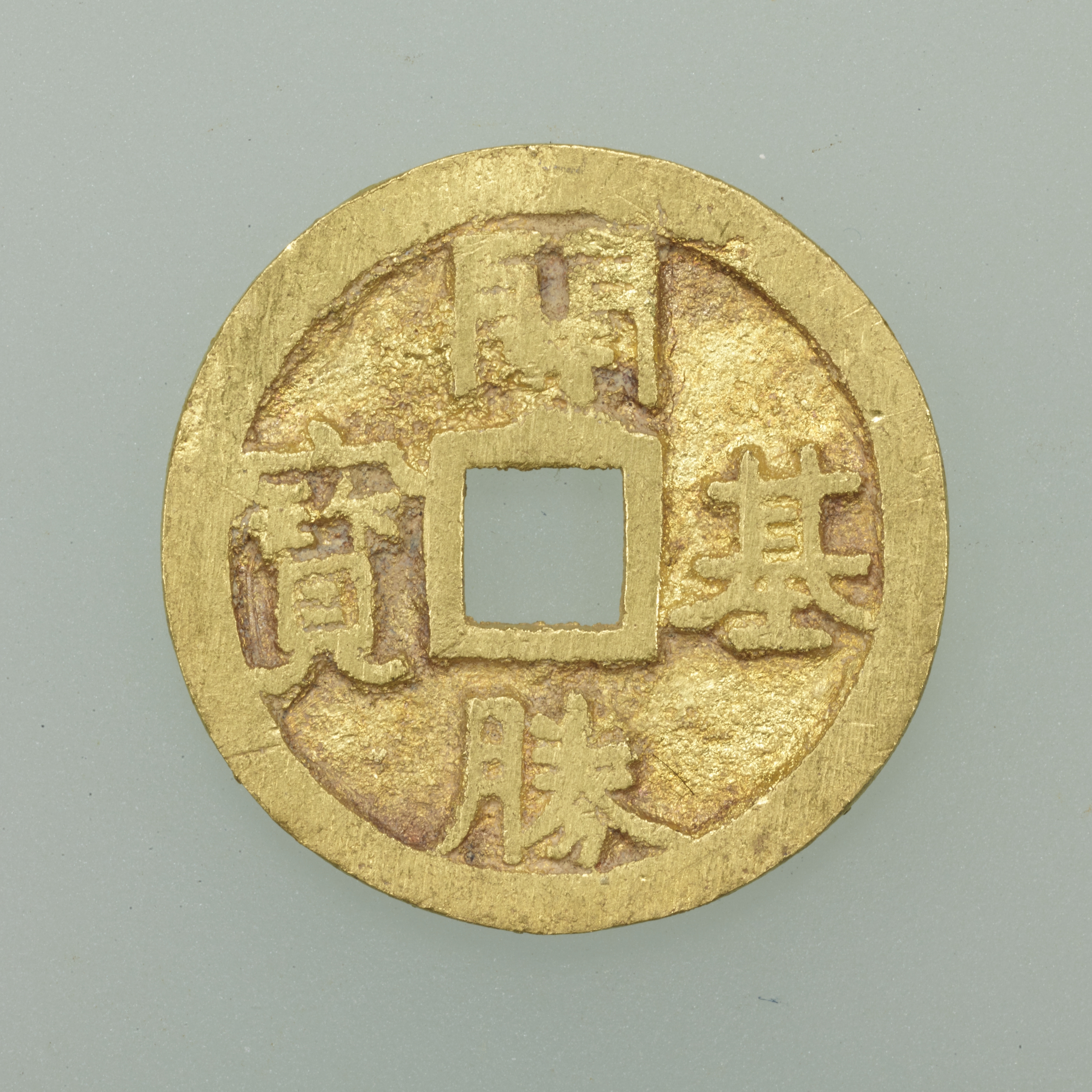
Japanese gold coin Kaiki Shōhō (開基勝寶) from 760

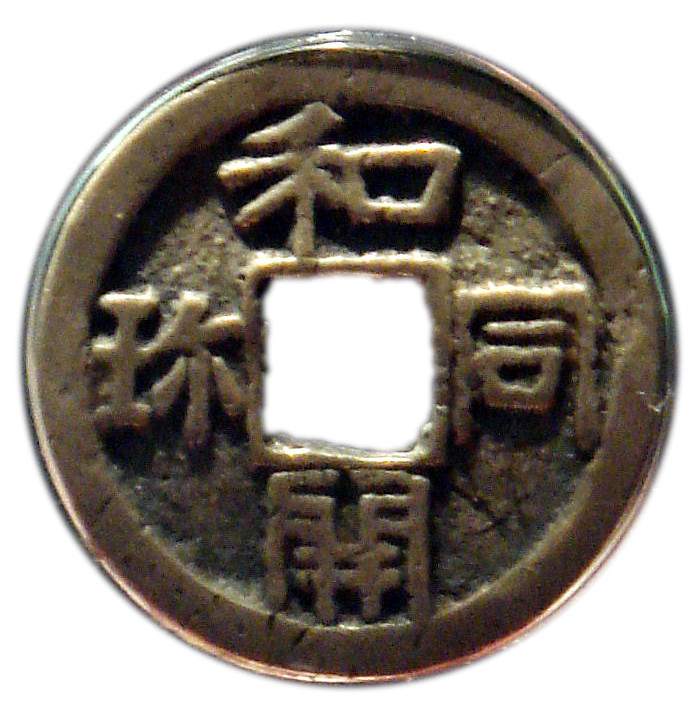
A silver Wadō Kaichin (和同開珎) coin from 8th-century Japan

==== Last issues (958) ====
The Kōchōsen Japanese system of coinage became strongly debased, with its metallic content and value decreasing. By the middle of the 9th century, the value of a coin in rice had fallen to 1/150th of its value of the early 8th century.

By the end of the 10th century, compounded with weaknesses in the political system, this led to the abandonment of the national currency, with the return to rice as a currency medium. The last official Japanese coin issue was in 958, with very low quality coins called Kengen Taihō (乹元大寶), which soon fell into disuse.

The last Kōchōsen coins produced after the Wadōkaichin include:

Inscription	Kyūjitai	Shinjitai	Year of introduction (Julian calendar)	Image
Wadō Kaichin	和同開珎		708	
Man'nen Tsūhō	萬年通寳	万年通宝	760	
Jingū Kaihō	神功開寳	神功開宝	765	
Ryūhei Eihō	隆平永寳	隆平永宝	796	
Fuju Shinpō	富壽神寳	富寿神宝	818	
Jōwa Shōhō	承和昌寳	承和昌宝	835	
Chōnen Taihō	長年大寳	長年大宝	848	
Jōeki Shinpō	饒益神寳	饒益神宝	859	
Jōgan Eihō	貞觀永寳	貞観永宝	870	
Kanpyō Taihō	寛平大寳	寛平大宝	890	
Engi Tsūhō	延喜通寳	延喜通宝	907	
Kengen Taihō	乹元大寳	乾元大宝	958	

=== Chinese coinage (12th–17th centuries) ===
==== Importation of Chinese coinage ====
From the 12th century, the expansion of trade and barter again highlighted the need for a currency. Chinese coinage came to be used as the standard currency of Japan, for a period lasting from the 12th to the 17th century. Coins were obtained from China through trade or through Wakō piracy. Coins were also imported from Annam (modern Vietnam) and Korea.

There is evidence to suggest that the Yuan dynasty used to extensively export Chinese cash coins to Japan for local circulation. The Sinan shipwreck, which was a ship from Ningbo to Hakata that sank off the Korean coast in the year 1323, carried some 8,000 strings of cash coins, which weighed about 26,775 kg.

==== Imitations of Chinese coinage ====
As the Chinese coins were not in sufficient number as trade and economy expanded, local Japanese imitations of Chinese coins were made from the 14th century, especially imitations of Ming coins, with inscribed names identical to those of contemporary Chinese coins. These coins had a very low value compared to Chinese coins, and several of them had to be exchanged for just one Chinese coin. This situation continued until the beginning of the Edo period, when a new system was put in place.

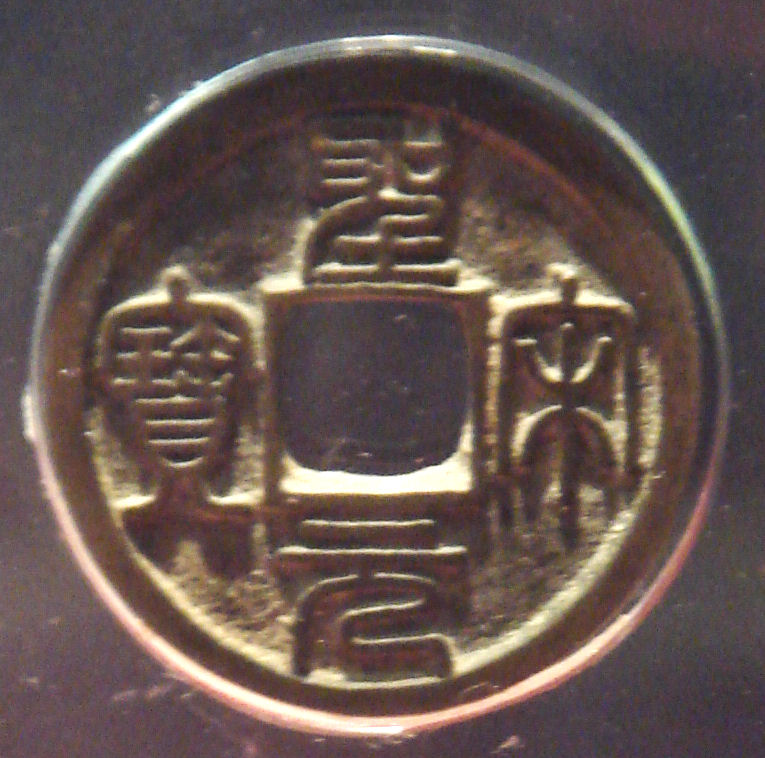
Northern Song Chinese coin Shèngsòng Yuánbǎo (聖宋元寶)

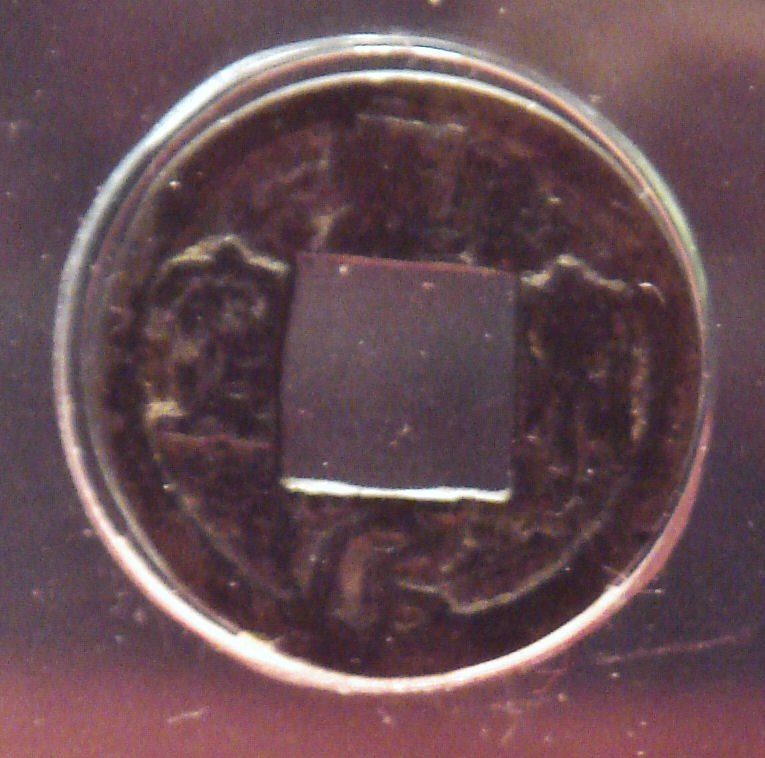
Seisō Genbō (聖宋元宝) Japanese imitation of the Song type, 14th–17th centuries

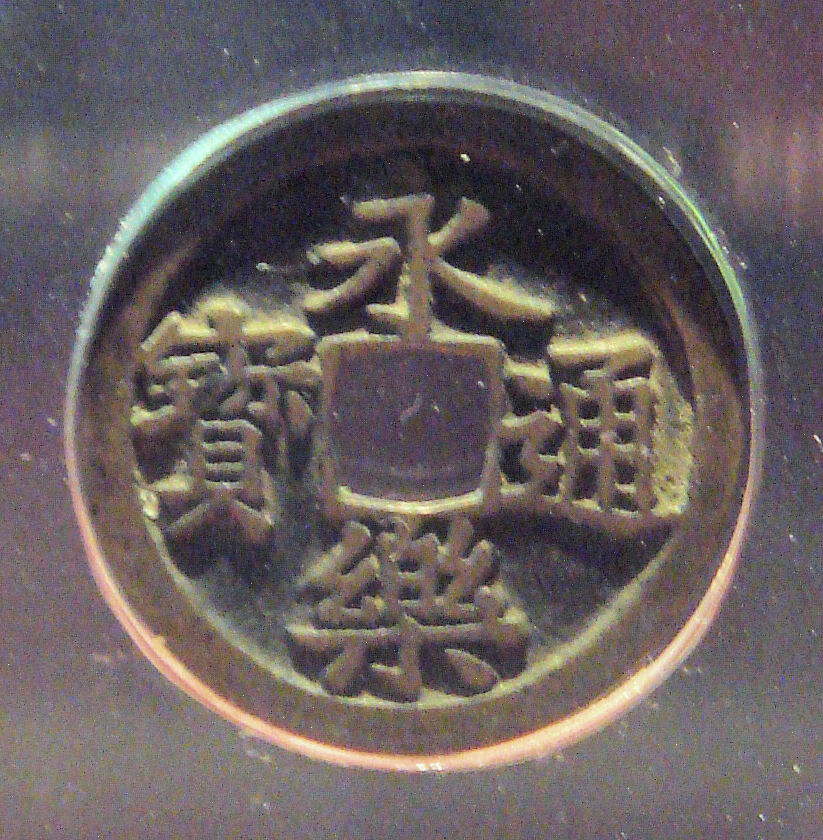
Chinese Ming coin Yǒnglè Tōngbǎo (永樂通寳) used as currency in Japan

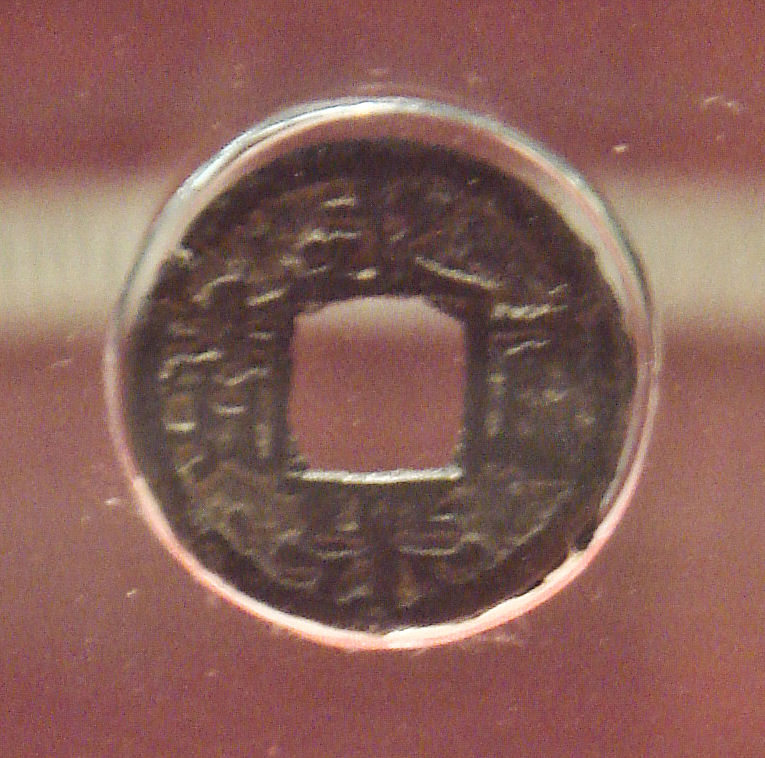
Eiraku Tsūhō (永楽通宝) Japanese imitation of the Ming type, 14th–17th centuries

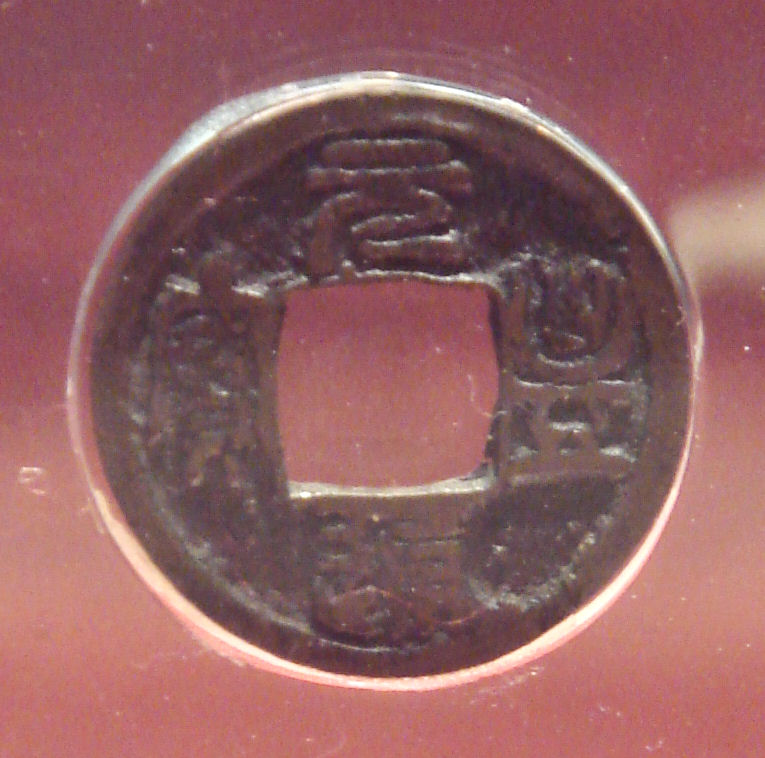
Genpō Tsūhō (元豊通宝) Japanese imitation, 14th–17th centuries

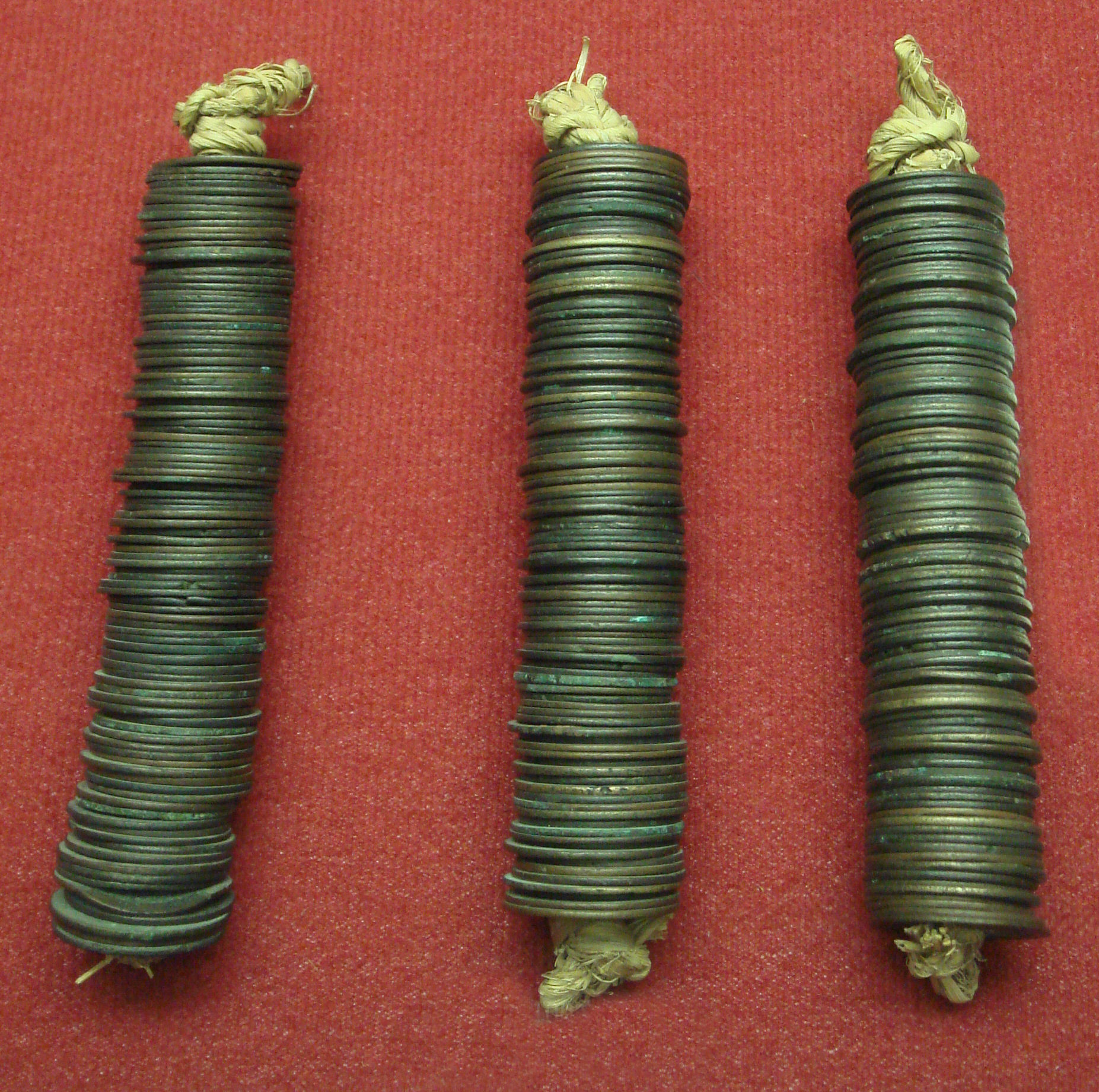
Bundles of 100 copper "Mon" coins; they were the official currency of Japan in the Muromachi period, from 1336 until 1870.

==== Local experiments (16th century) ====
The growth of the economy and trade meant that small copper currency became insufficient to cover the amounts that were being exchanged. During the Sengoku period, the characteristics of the future Edo period system began to emerge. Local Lords developed trade, abolishing monopolistic guilds, which led to the need for large-denomination currencies. From the 16th century, local experiments started to be made, with the minting of local coins, sometimes in gold. Especially the Takeda clan of Kōshū minted gold coins which were later adopted by the Tokugawa shogunate.

Hideyoshi unified Japan, and thus centralized most of the minting of large denomination silver and gold coins, effectively putting in place the basis of a unified currency system. Hideyoshi developed the large Ōban plate, also called the Tenshō Ōban (天正大判), in 1588, a predecessor to Tokugawa gold coinage.

A common practice in that period was to melt gold into copper molds for convenience, derived from the sycee manufacturing method. These were called Bundōkin (分銅金), of which there were two types, the small Kobundō (小分銅), and the large Ōbundō (大分銅). A Kobundō would represent about 373 g in gold.

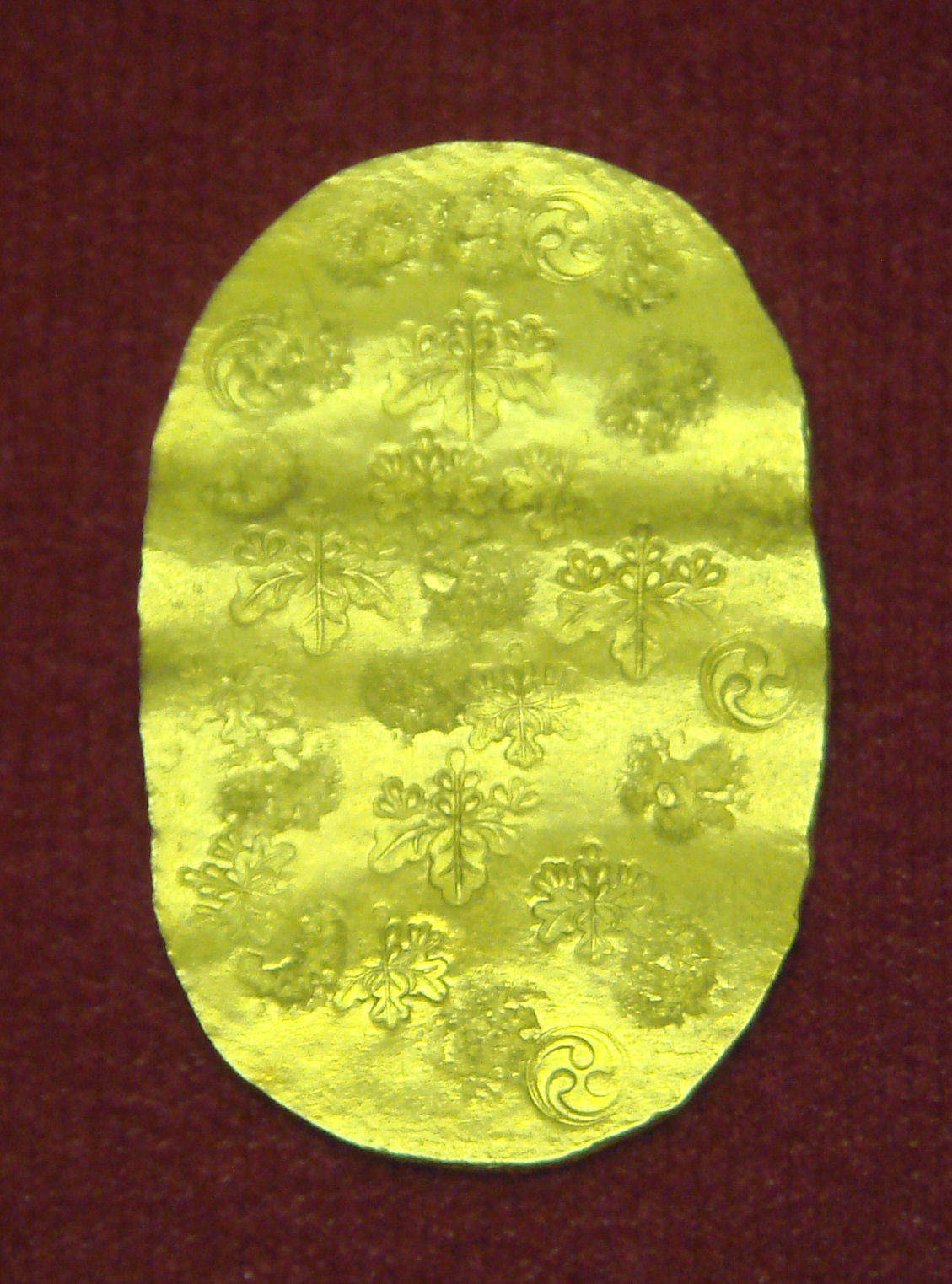
Kiritomoeban (桐巴判), 16th century

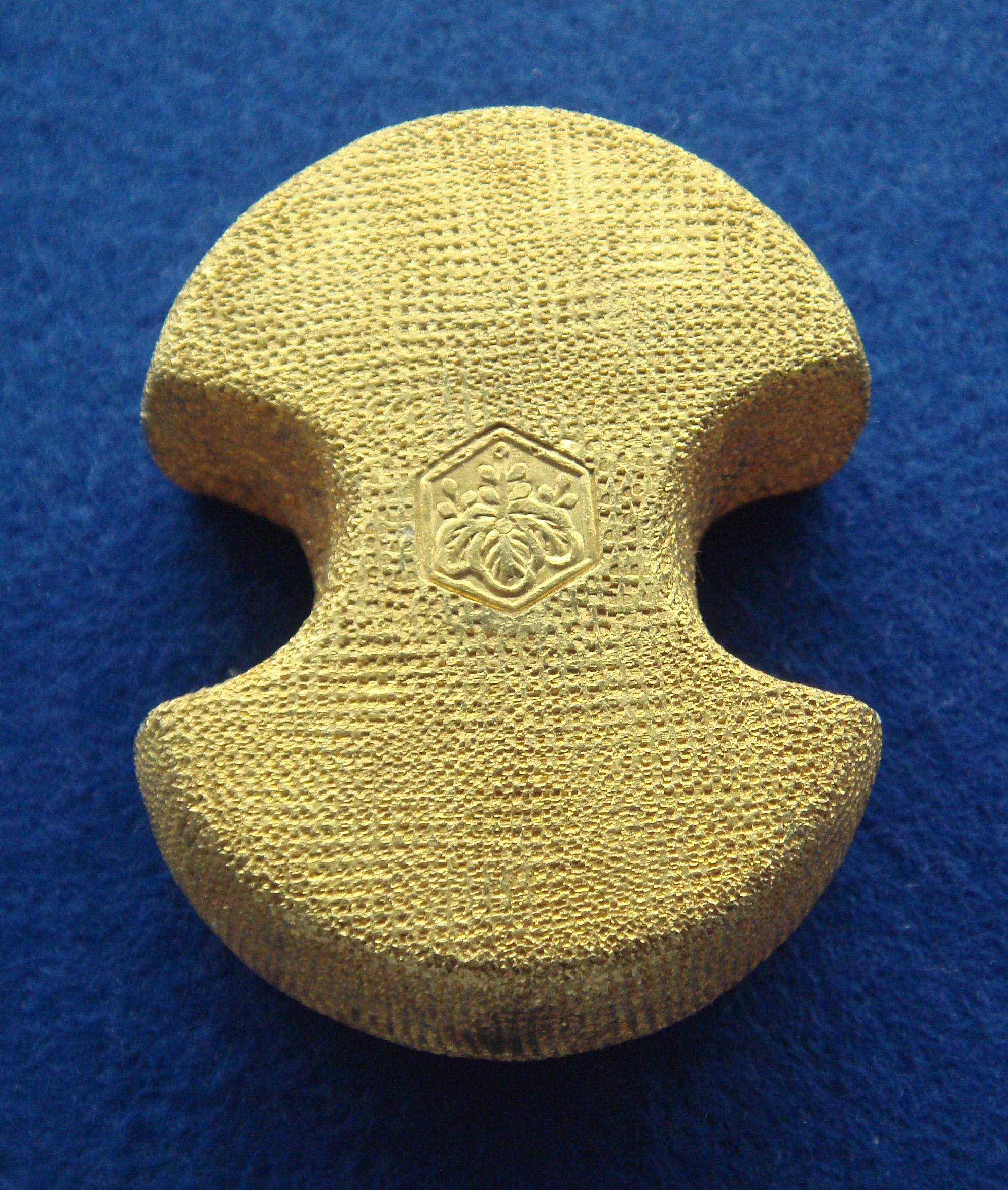
Kobundō, "Turtle scale Paulownia" Kinkōkiri mark (亀甲桐), Nunome (布目) emblem

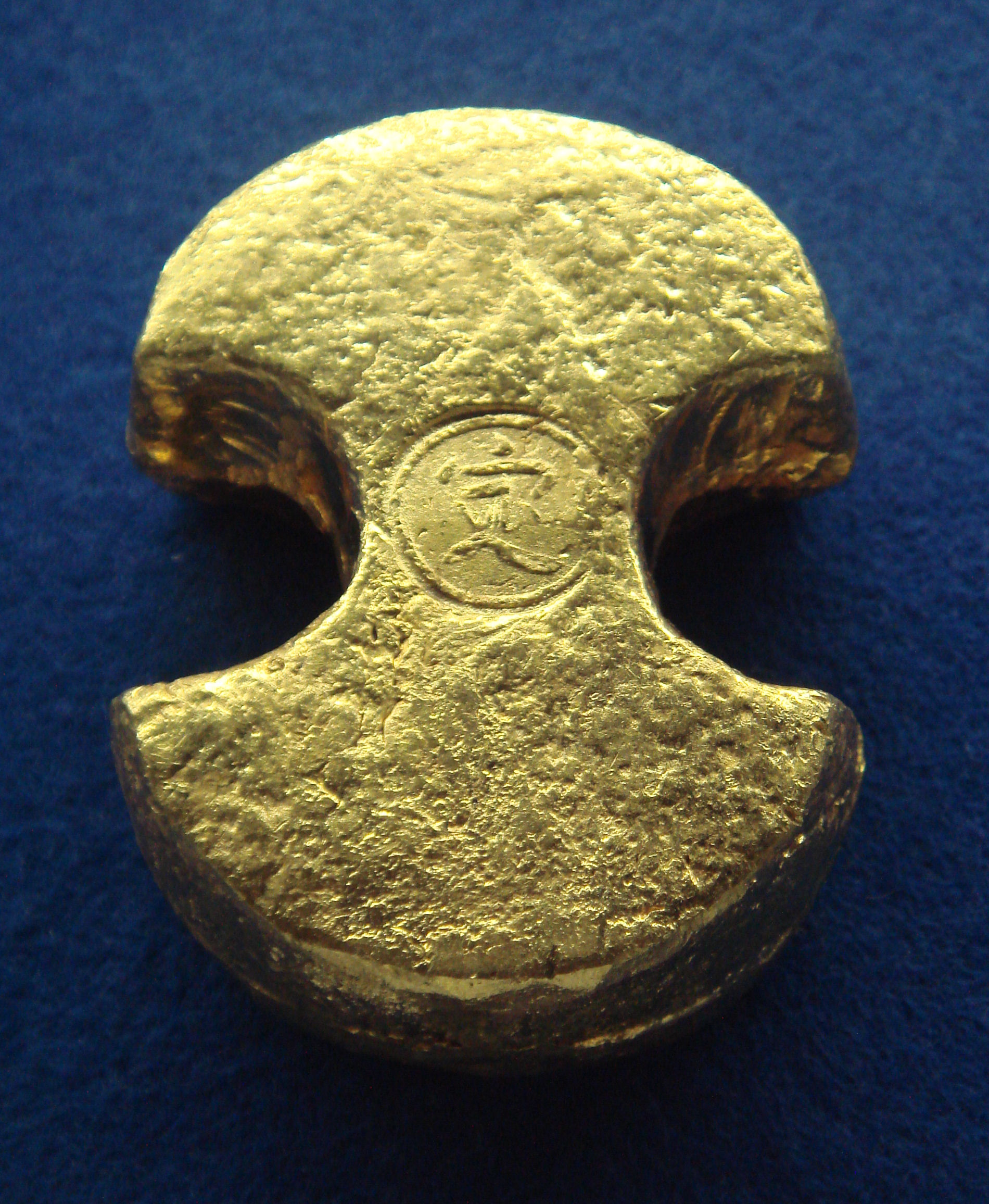
Kobundō, "Fixed" Tei mark (定), Ishime (石目) emblem

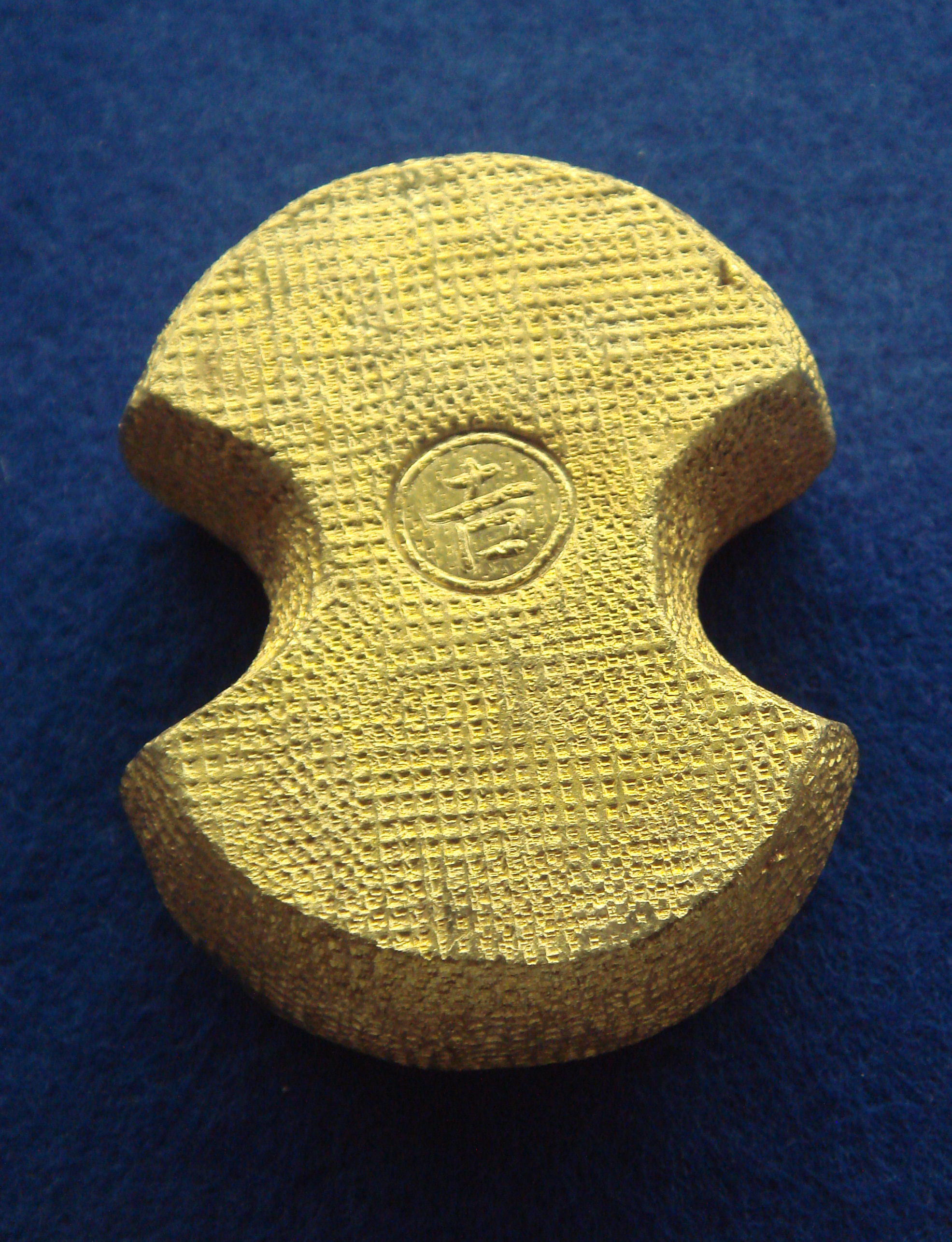
Kobundō, "happiness" Kichi mark (吉) mark, Nunome (布目) emblem

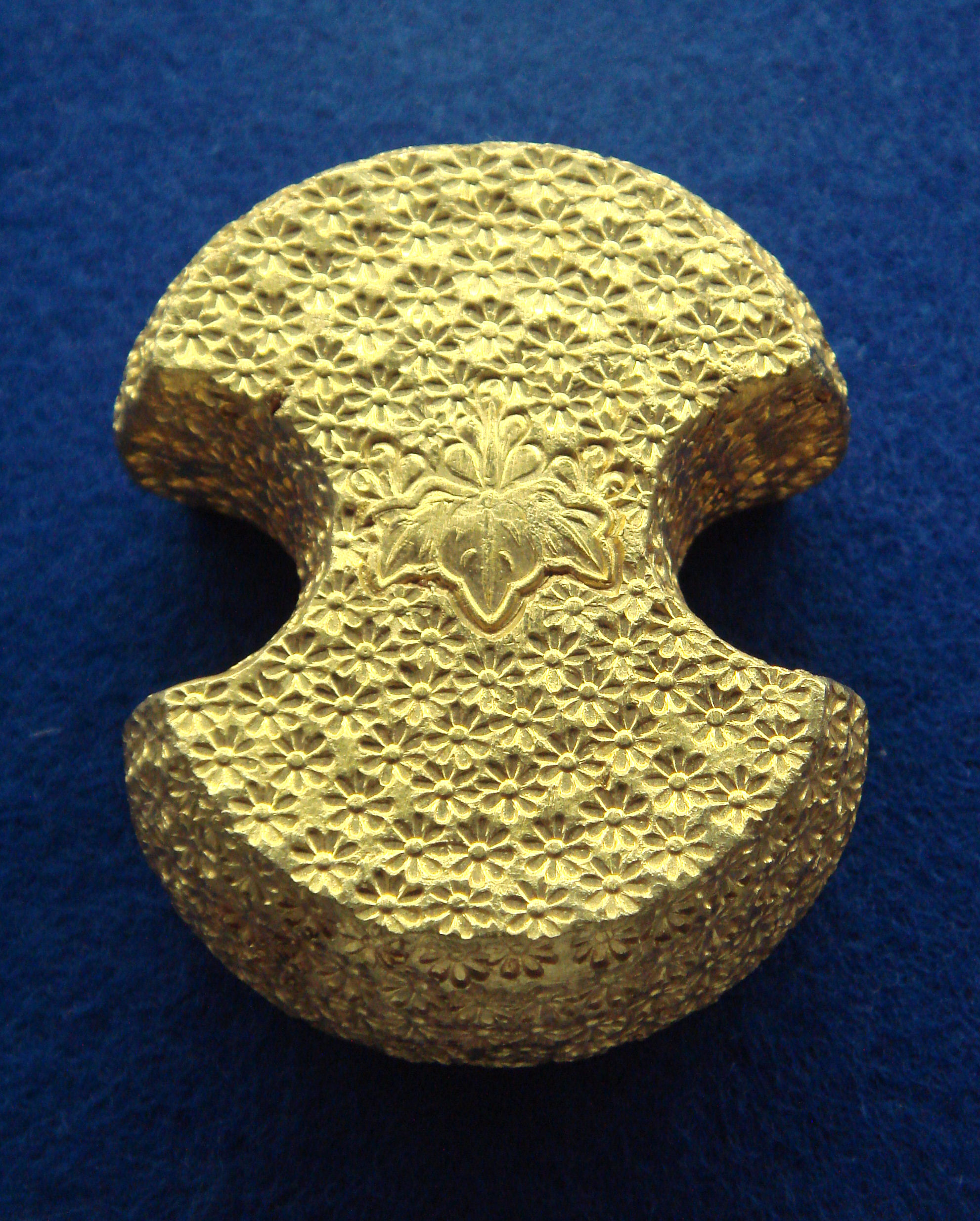
A Kobundō (小分銅), 95–97% gold, "Paulownia" Kiri mark (桐), Kikubana (菊花) emblem, 373.11 grams

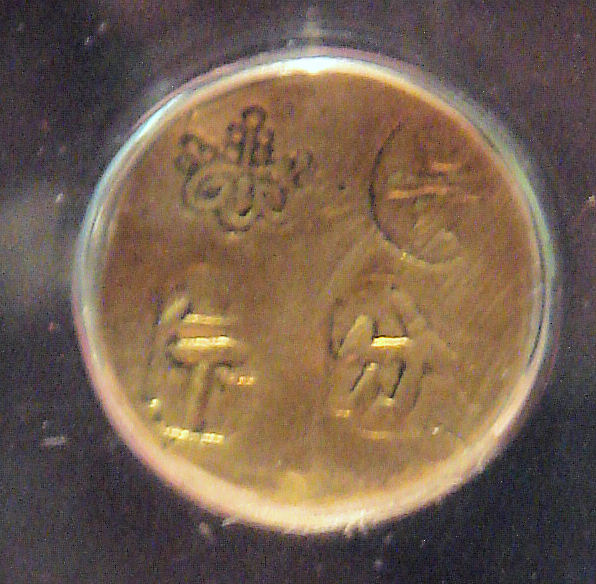
An early minting experiment by the Takeda clan of Kōshū (甲州金) in the 16th century

=== Tokugawa currency (17th–19th centuries) ===
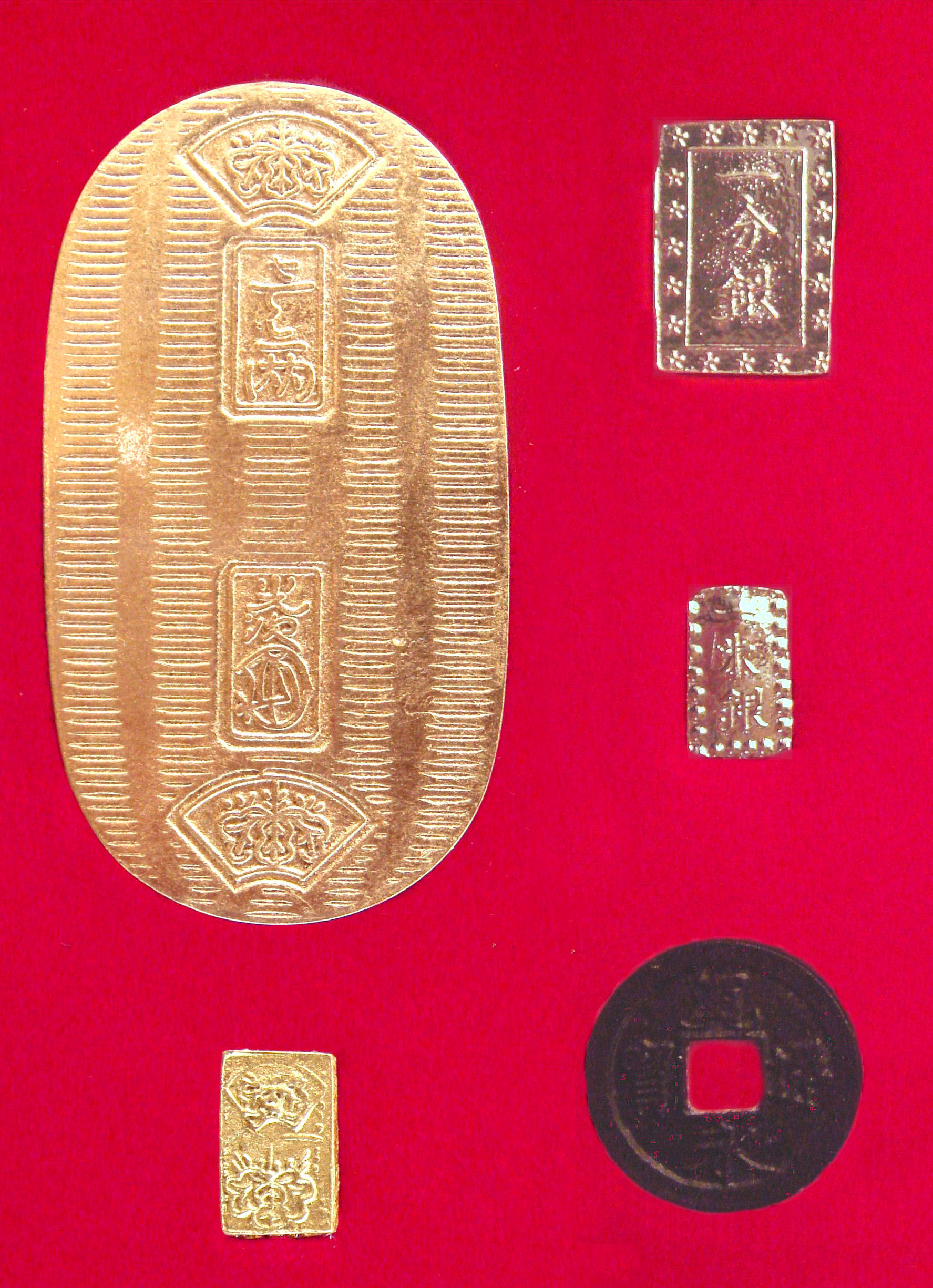
Main coins of Tokugawa coinage. A large ovoid gold Koban, under it a small gold Ichibuban, top right a silver Ichibugin, under it a silver Ichibuban and a bronze round "Kan'ei tsūhō" Mon

Tokugawa coinage was a unitary and independent metallic monetary system established by shōgun Tokugawa Ieyasu in 1601 in Japan, and which lasted throughout the Tokugawa period until its end in 1867.

From 1601, Tokugawa coinage consisted of gold, silver, and bronze denominations. The denominations were fixed, but the rates actually fluctuated on the exchange market. Tokugawa started by minting Keicho gold and silver coins, and Chinese copper coins were later replaced by Kan'ei Tsuho coins in 1670.

The material for the coinage came from gold and silver mines across Japan. For this purpose, new gold mines were opened, such as the Sado and Toi gold mines in the Izu Peninsula. Regarding diamond coins, the Kan'ei Tsūhō coin (寛永通宝) came to replace the Chinese coins that had been in circulation in Japan, as well as those that were privately minted, and became the legal tender for small denominations.

Yamada Hagaki, Japan's first notes, were issued around 1600 by Shinto priests also working as merchants in the Ise-Yamada (modern Mie Prefecture), in exchange for silver. This was earlier than the first goldsmith notes issued in England around 1640. The first known feudal note was issued by the Fukui clan in 1661. During the 17th century, the feudal domains developed a system of feudal notes, giving currency to pledged notes issued by the lord of the domain, in exchange for convertibility to gold, silver or copper. Japan thus combined gold, silver, and copper standards with the circulation of paper money.

Tokugawa coinage remained in use during the Sakoku period of seclusion, although it was progressively debased to try to manage government deficits. The first debasement, in 1695, was called the Genroku Recoinage.

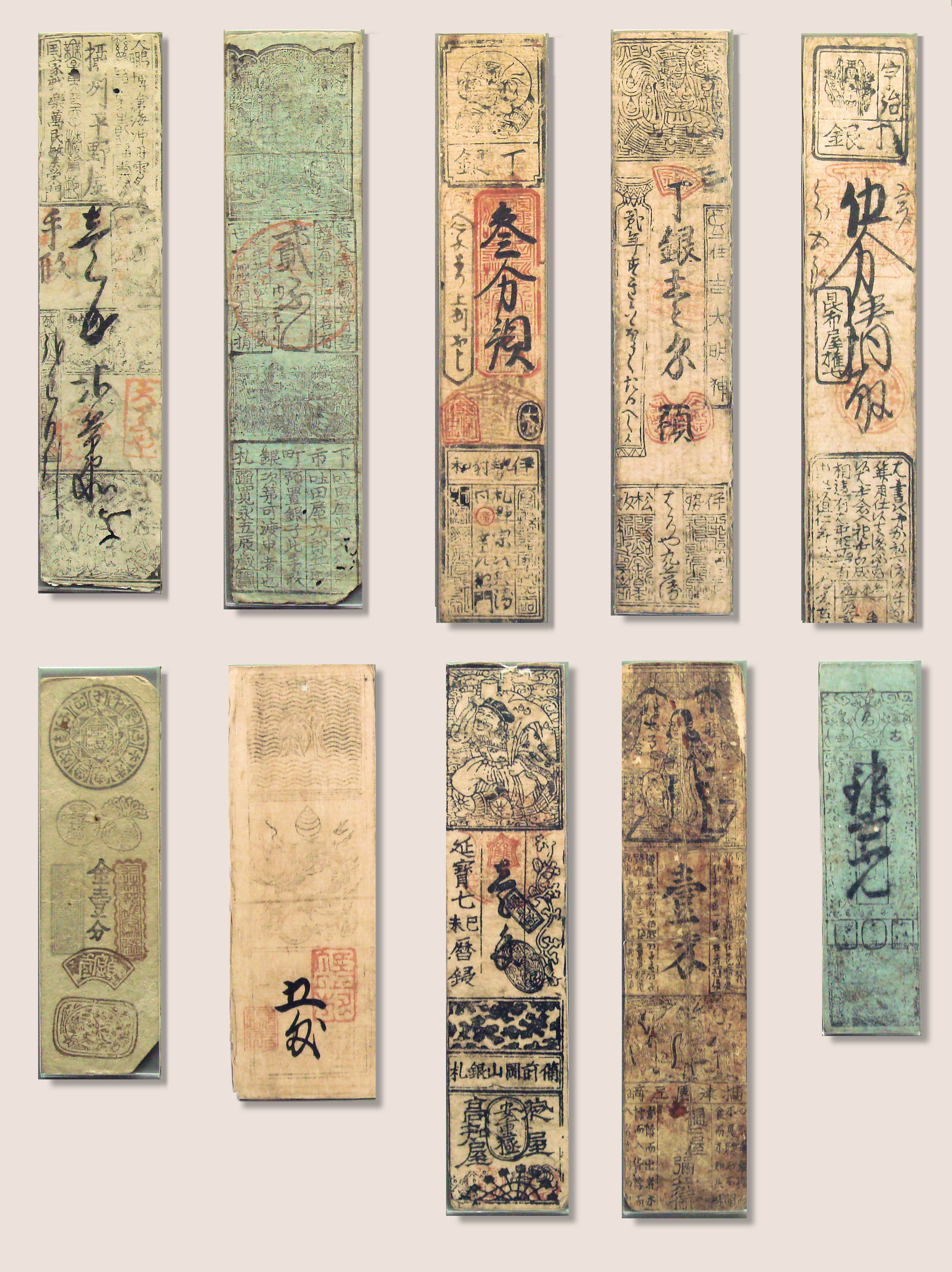
Feudal notes of Japan, Edo period.

=== Bakumatsu currency (1854–1868) ===
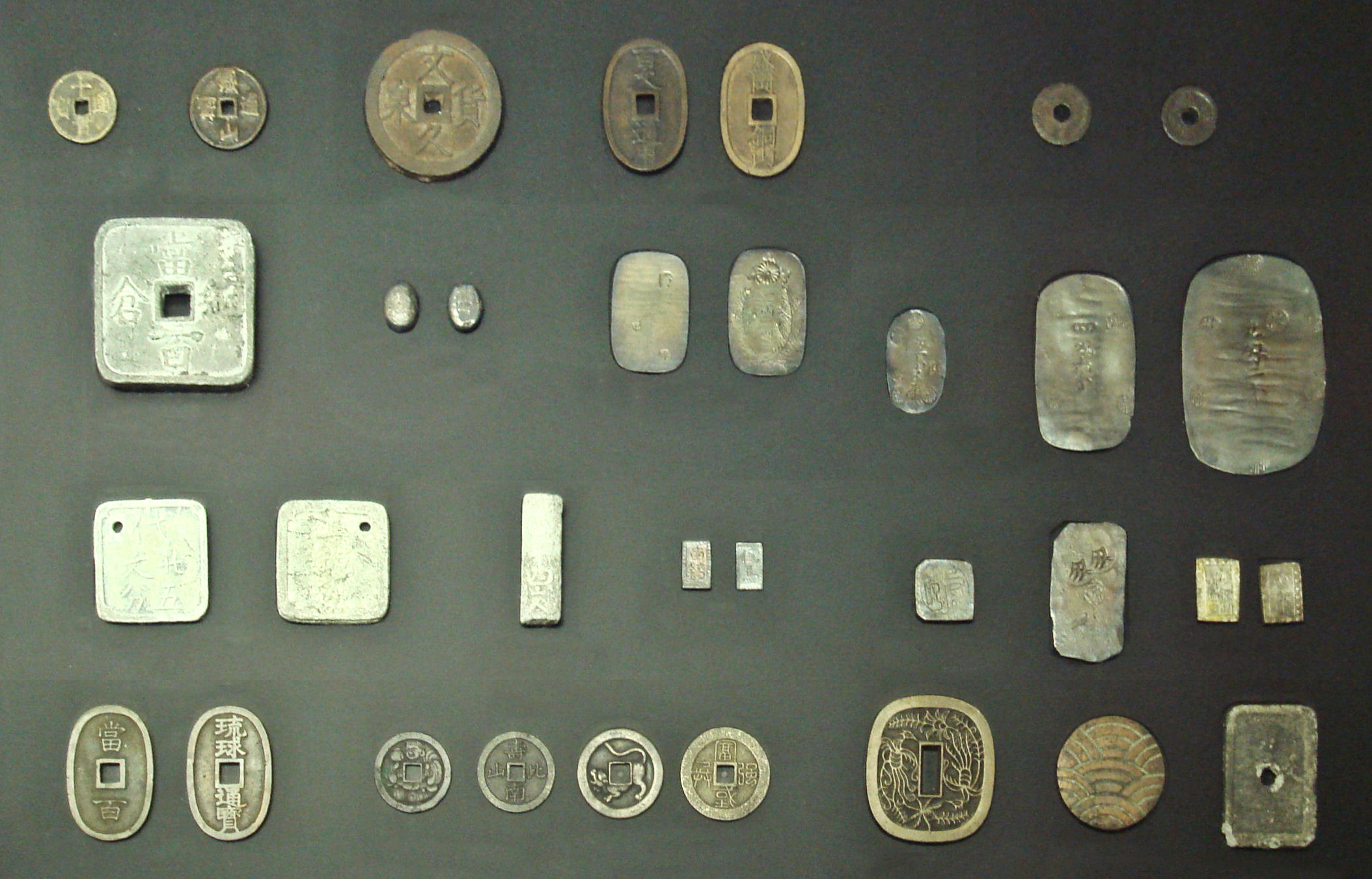
Proliferation of local Japanese coinage during the Bakumatsu period.

The Tokugawa coinage collapsed following the reopening of Japan to the West in 1854, as the silver-gold exchange rates gave foreigners huge opportunities for arbitrage, leading to the export of large quantities of gold. Gold traded for silver in Japan at a 1:5 ratio, while that ratio was 1:15 abroad. During the Bakumatsu period in 1859 Mexican dollars were even given official currency in Japan, by coining them with marks in Japanese and officializing their exchange rate of three bu. They were called Aratame Sanbu Sadame (改三分定, "Fixed to the value of three bu").

Meanwhile, local governments issued their own currency chaotically, so that the nation's money supply expanded by 2.5 times between 1859 and 1869, leading to crumbling money values and soaring prices. The system was replaced by a new one after the conclusion of the Boshin War, and with the onset of the Meiji government in 1868.

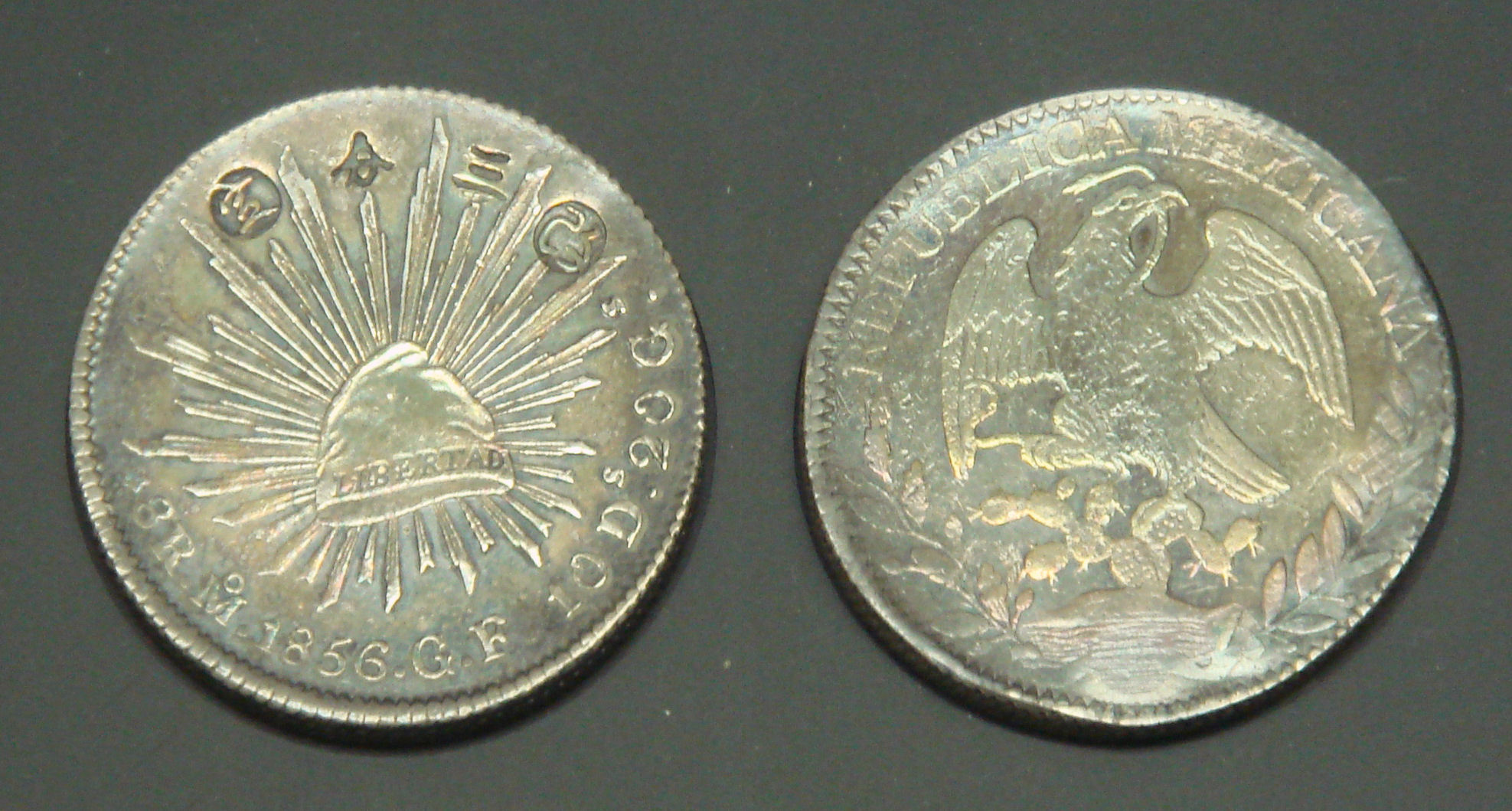
A Mexican dollar used as currency in Japan, marked with Aratame sanbu sadame (改三分定, Fixed to the value of three bu) from 1859.

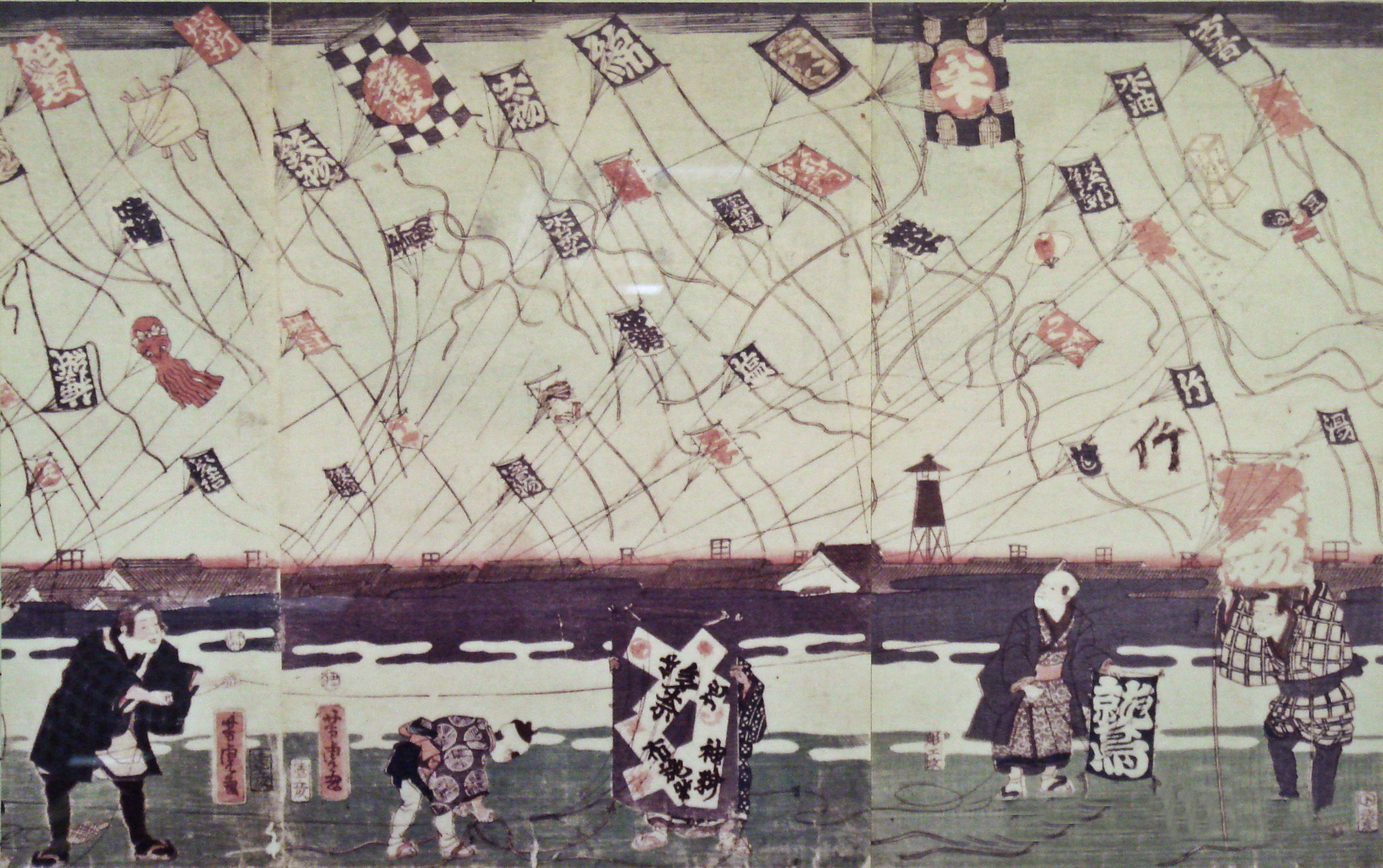
Allegory of inflation and soaring prices during the Bakumatsu era.

=== Imperial Japan (1871–present) ===
Following 1868, a new currency system based on the Japanese yen was progressively established along Western lines, which has remained Japan's currency system to this day.

Immediately after the Meiji Restoration in 1868, previous gold, silver and copper coins, as well as feudal notes, continued to circulate, leading to great confusion. In 1868, the government also issued coins and gold-convertible paper money, called Daijōkansatsu (太政官札), denominated in Ryō, an old unit from the Edo period, and private banks called Kawase Kaisha were allowed to issue their own currency as well. Complexity, widespread counterfeiting of gold coins and feudal notes led to widespread confusion.

==== Birth of the yen: New Currency Act (1871) ====
Through the New Currency Act of 1871, Japan adopted the gold standard along international lines, with 1 yen corresponding to 1.5g of pure gold. The Meiji government issued new notes, called Meiji Tsūhōsatsu (明治通宝札), in 1872, which were printed in Germany.

Silver coins were also issued for trade with Asian countries who favoured silver as a currency, thus establishing a de facto gold-silver standard.

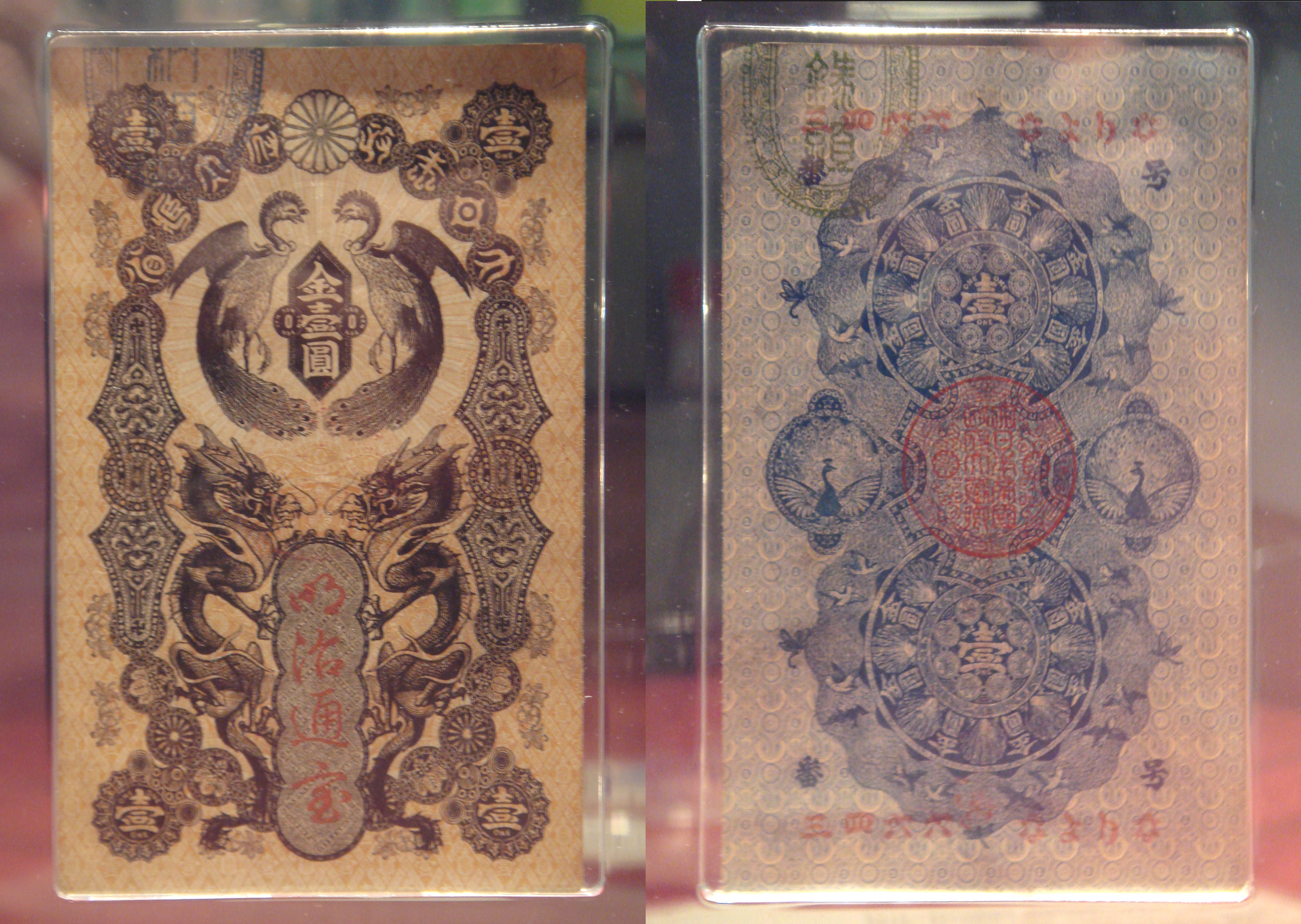
The First Meiji one yen banknote, Meiji Tsūhōsatsu (明治通宝札) from 1871.

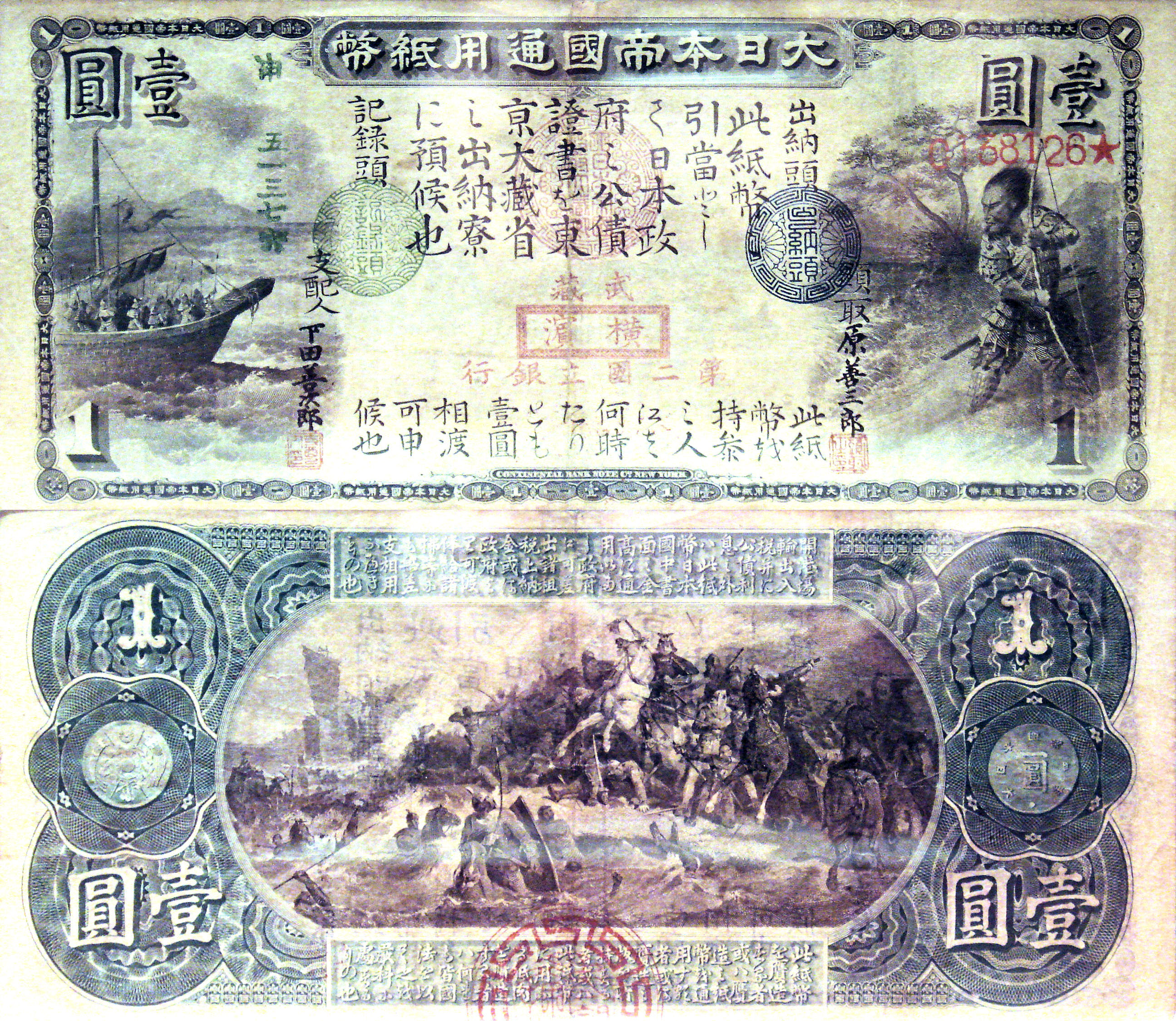
An early 1 yen banknote showing both the front and reverse. National Bank notes, 1873.

==== National Bank Act (1872) ====
The National Bank Act of 1872 led to the establishment of four banks between 1873 and 1874, and there were more than 153 national banks by the end of 1879. The national banks issued identically designed convertible notes, which were effective in funding industry and progressively replaced government notes. In 1876, an amendment allowed the banks to make the banknotes virtually non-convertible. These national banknotes imitated the design of American banknotes, although the name of the issuer was different for each.

Severe inflation broke out with the Seinan Civil War in 1877. This was controlled by the reduction of government spending and the removal of paper currency from circulation. During the Seinan Civil War, an original type of paper money was issued by the rebel leader Saigō Takamori in order to finance his war effort.

In 1881, the first Japanese note to feature a portrait, the Empress Jingū note (神功皇后札), was issued.

==== Bank of Japan (1882) ====
In order to regularize the issuance of convertible banknotes, a central bank, the Bank of Japan, was established in 1882. The bank would stabilize the currency by centralizing the issuance of convertible banknotes. The first central banknotes were issued by the Bank of Japan in 1885. They were called Daikokusatsu (大黒札), and were convertible in silver.

Following the devaluation of silver, and the abandonment of silver as a currency standard by Western powers, Japan adopted the gold standard through the Coinage Law of 1897. The yen was fixed at 0.75g of pure gold, and banknotes were issued which were convertible into gold. In 1899, the National Banks banknotes were declared invalid, leaving the Bank of Japan as the only supplier of currency.

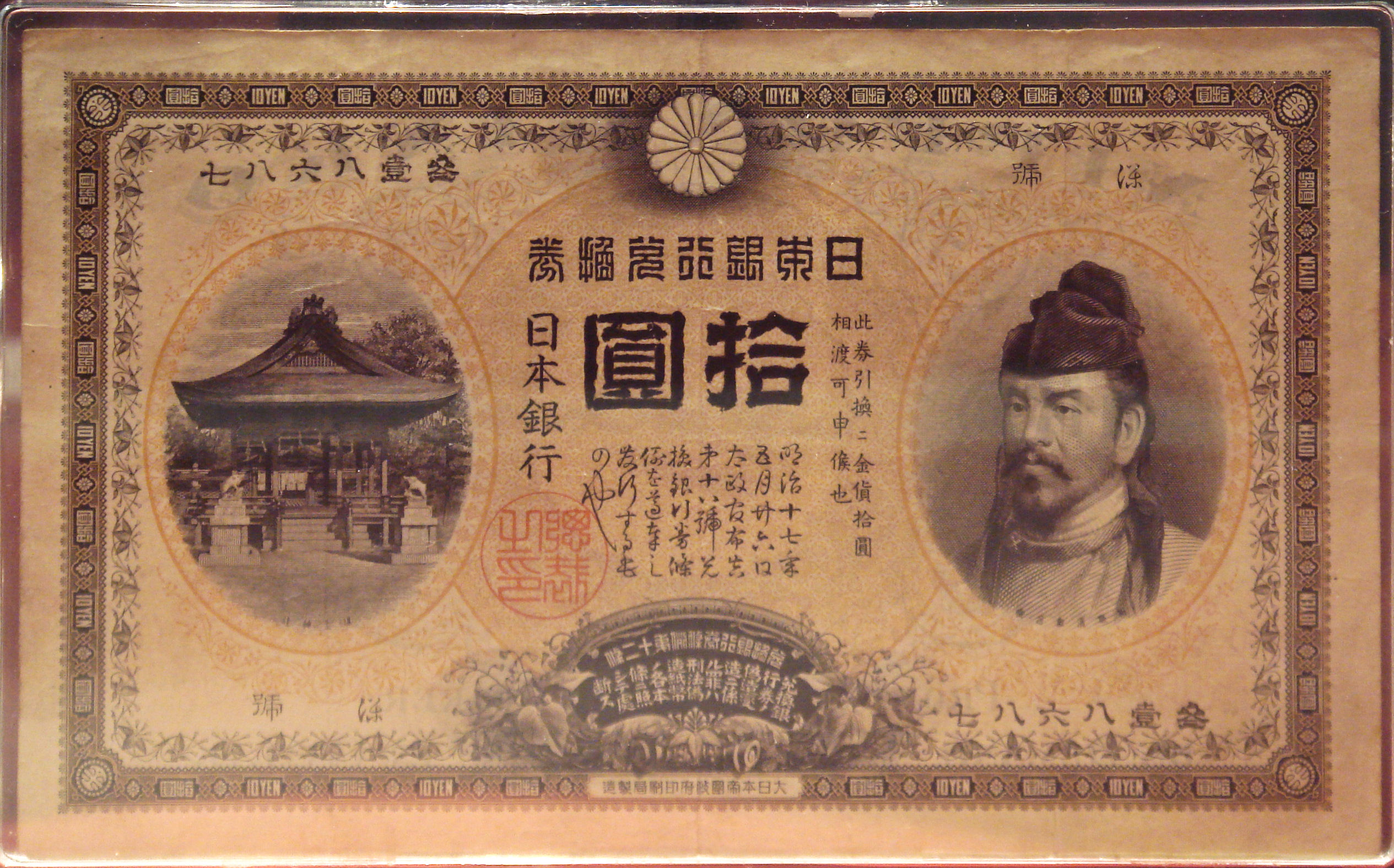
A Bank of Japan gold-convertible yen banknote from 1900.

==== World Wars ====
During World War I, Japan prohibited the export of gold in 1917, as did many countries such as the United States. Gold convertibility was again shortly established in January 1930, only to be abandoned in 1931 when Great Britain abandoned the gold standard. Conversion of banknotes into gold was suspended.

From 1941, Japan formally adopted a managed currency system, and in 1942 the Bank of Japan Law officially suppressed the obligation of conversion.

== Modern yen ==
In 1946, following the Second World War, Japan removed the old currency (旧円券) and introduced the "New Yen" (新円券). Meanwhile, American occupation forces used a parallel system, called B yen, from 1945 to 1958.

Since then, together with the economic expansion of Japan, the yen has become one of the major currencies of the world.

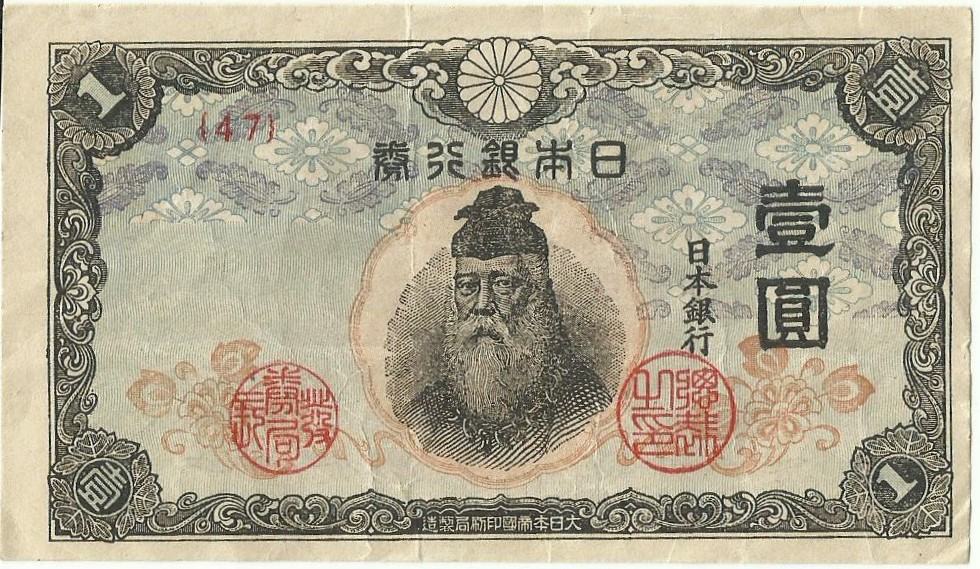
Front of the 1944 one-yen banknote

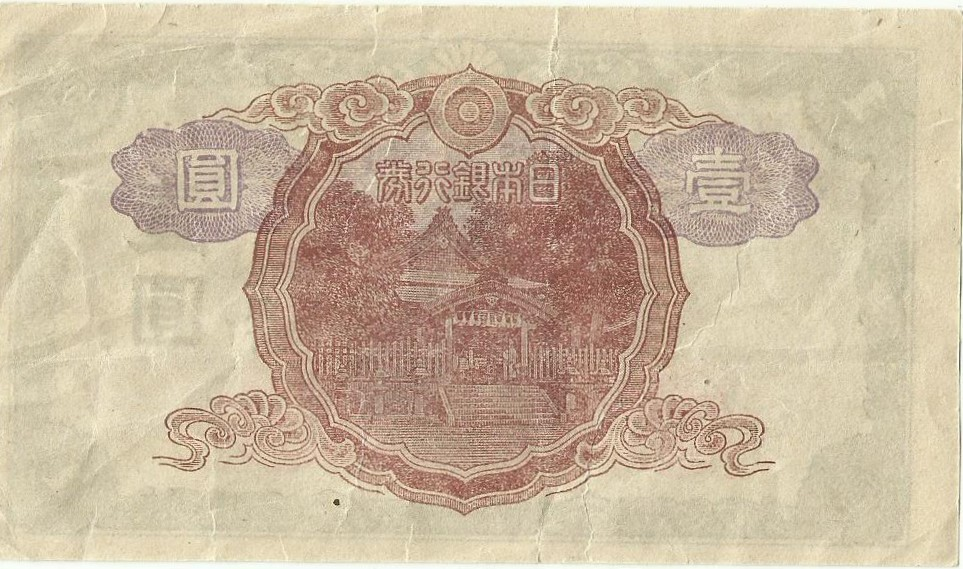
Reverse of the 1944 one-yen banknote

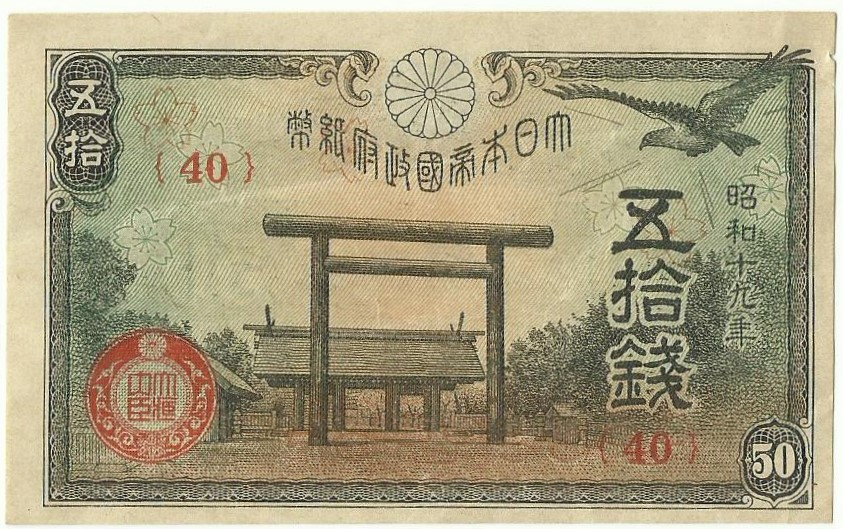
Front of the 1946 fifty-sen banknote

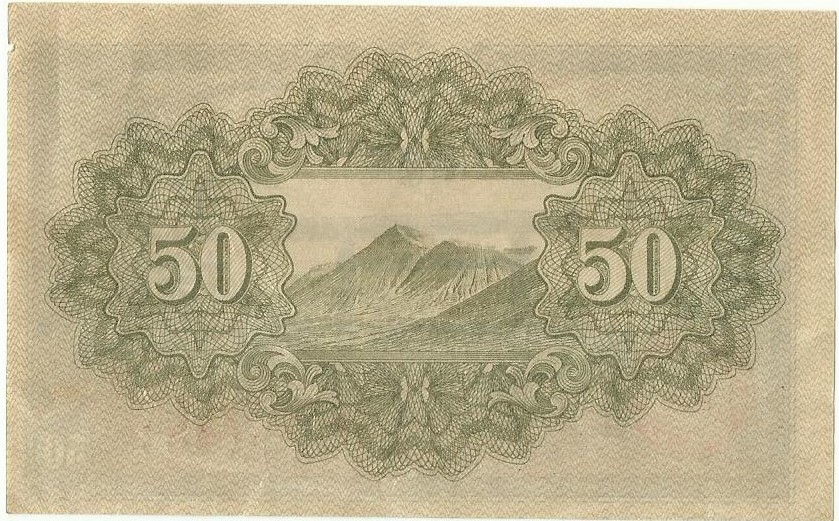
Reverse of the 1946 fifty-sen banknote

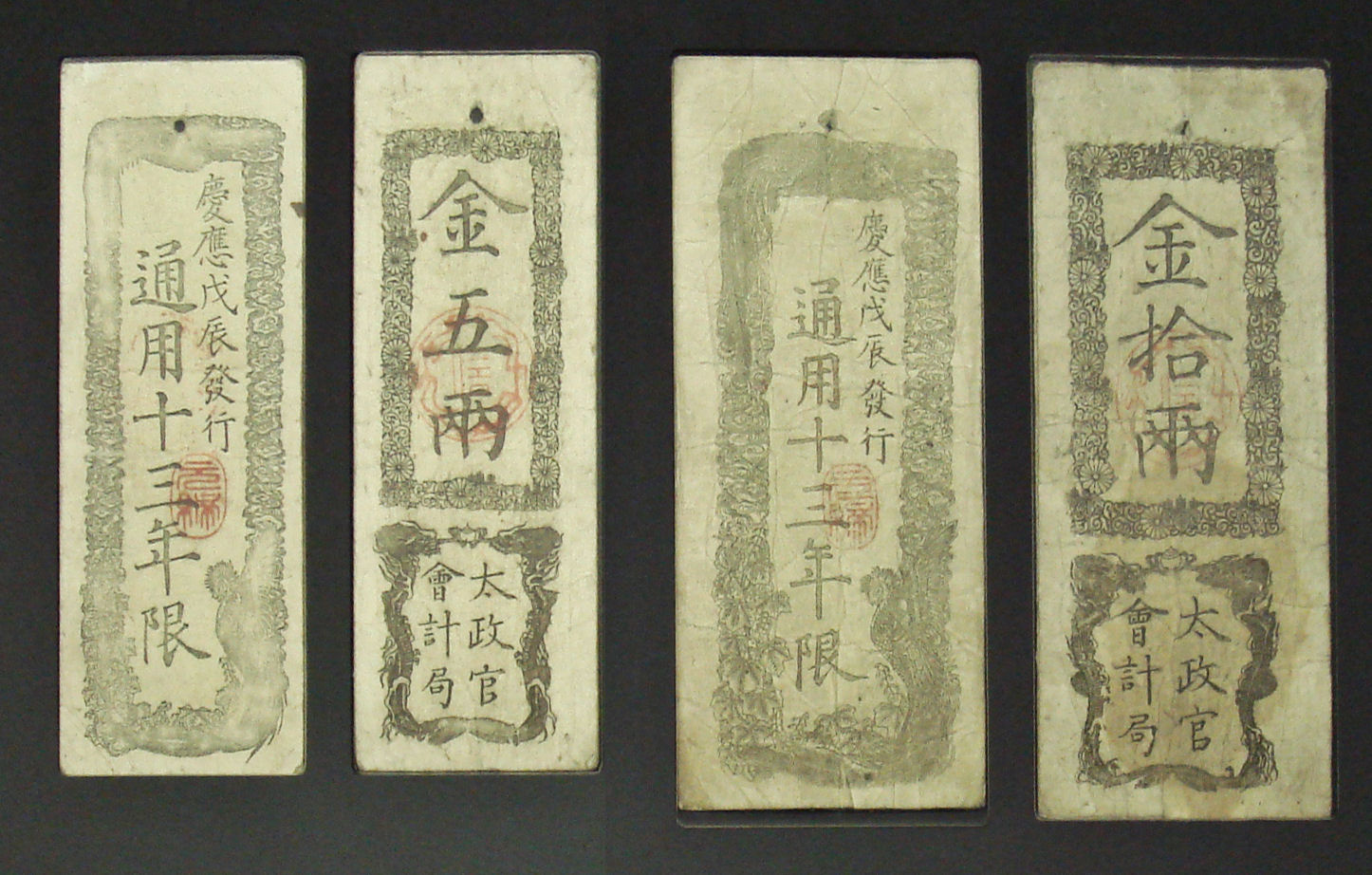
Daijōkansatsu notes (太政官札) denominated in Ryō, 1868, Japan

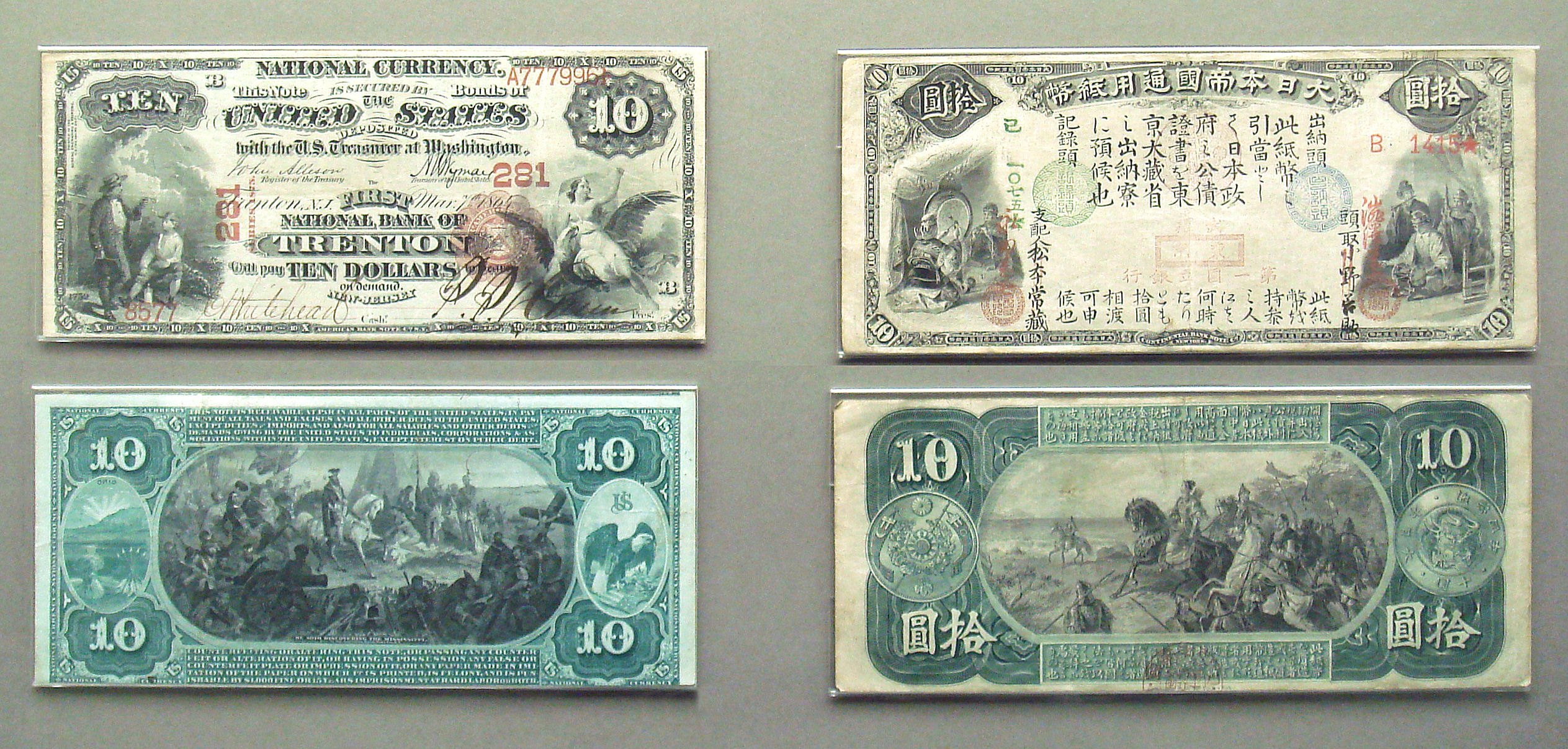
American banknote, and Japanese 1873 banknote closely following the U.S. design

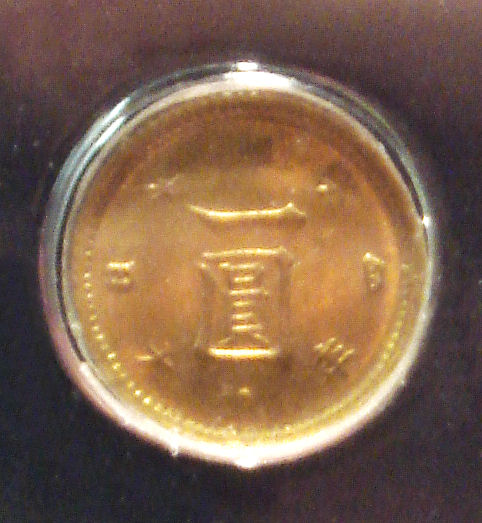
An early one yen gold coin

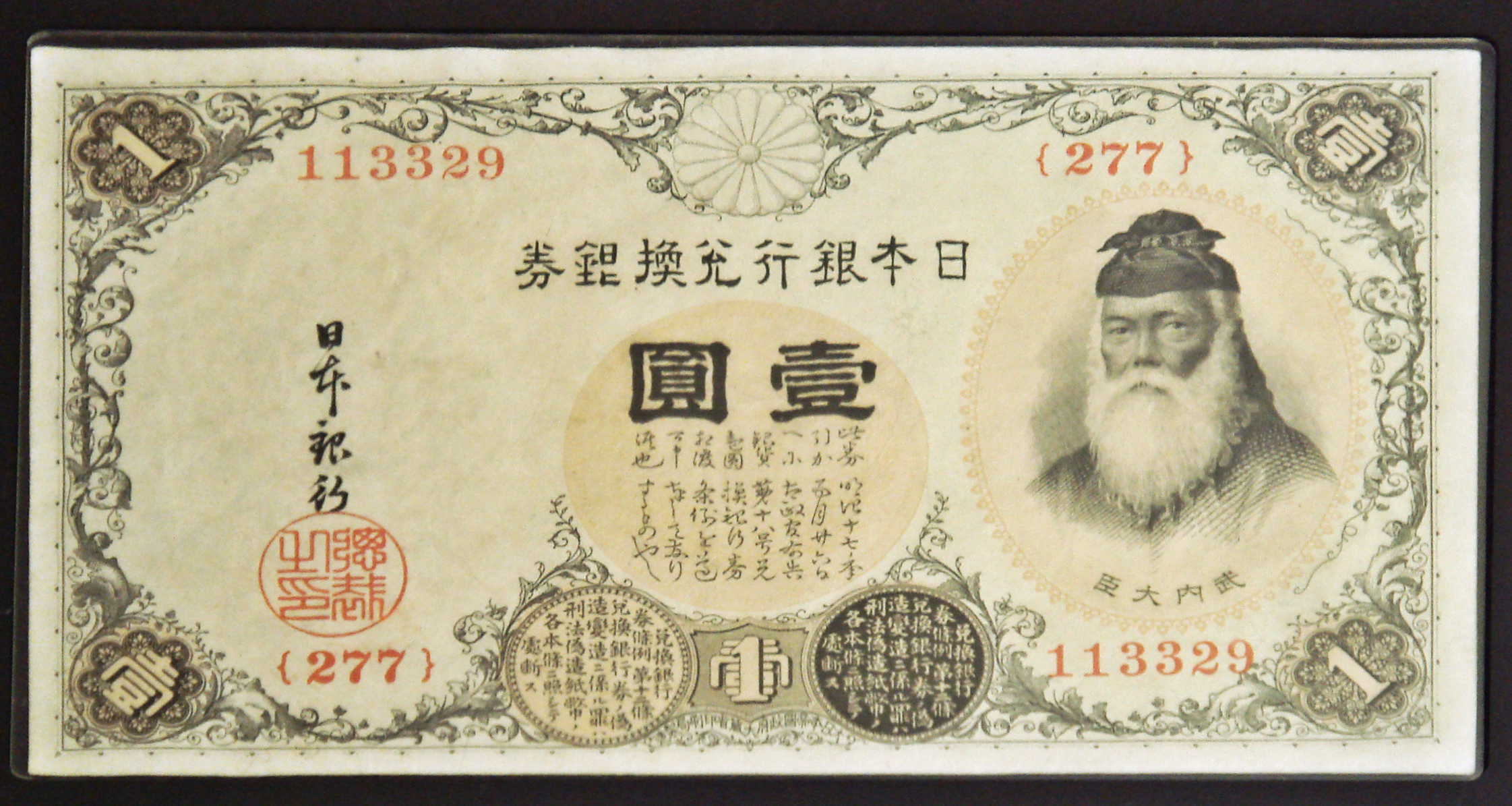
A gold standard one yen banknote from 1916

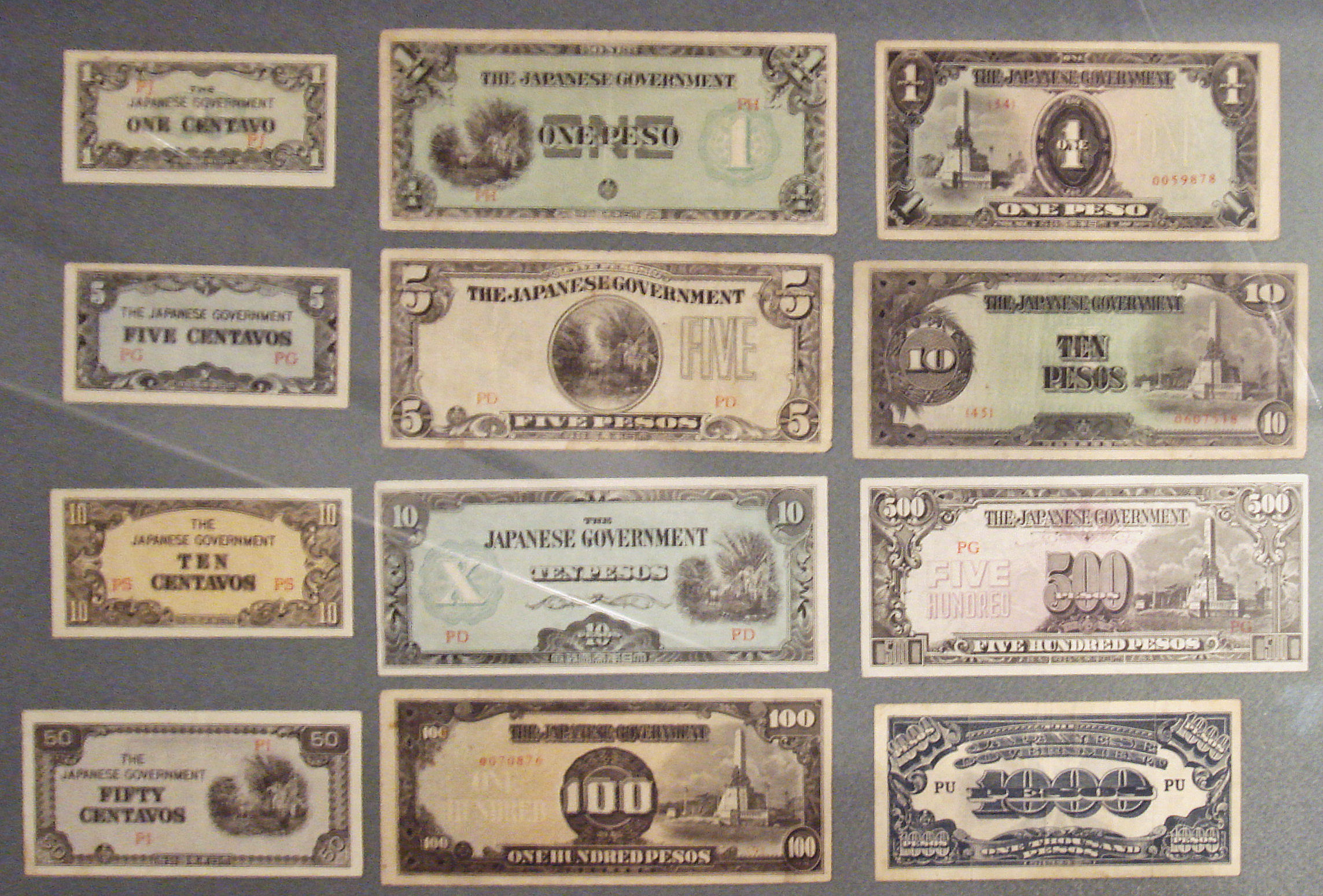
Japanese Government Asian banknotes distributed during the World War II, specifically to the Philippines

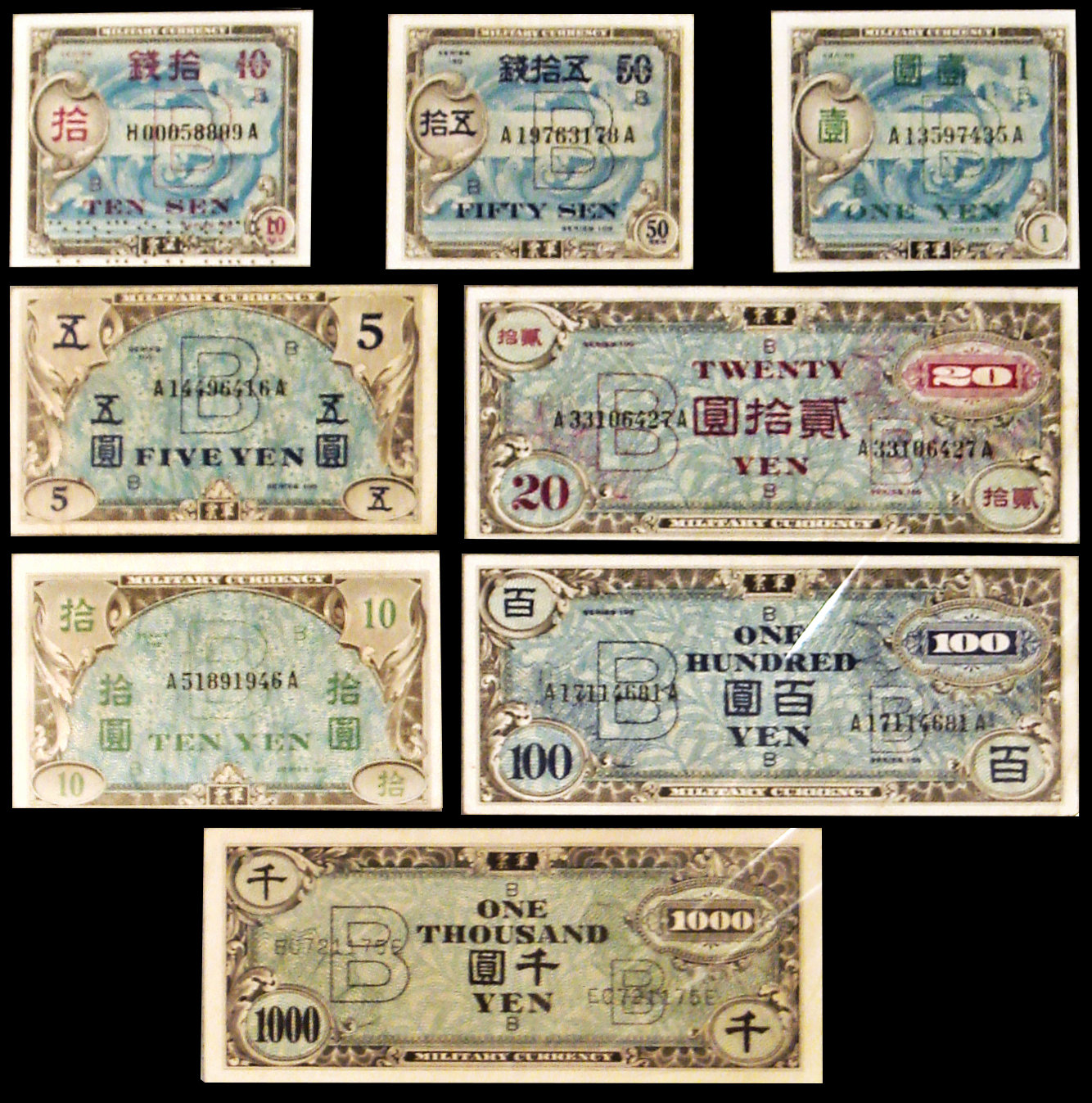
A complete set of "B Yen" notes used by American occupation forces in 1945–1958

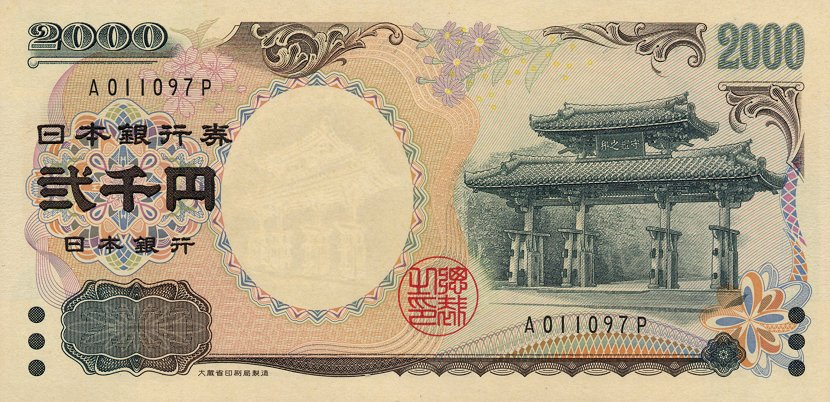
A Series D 2,000 yen note

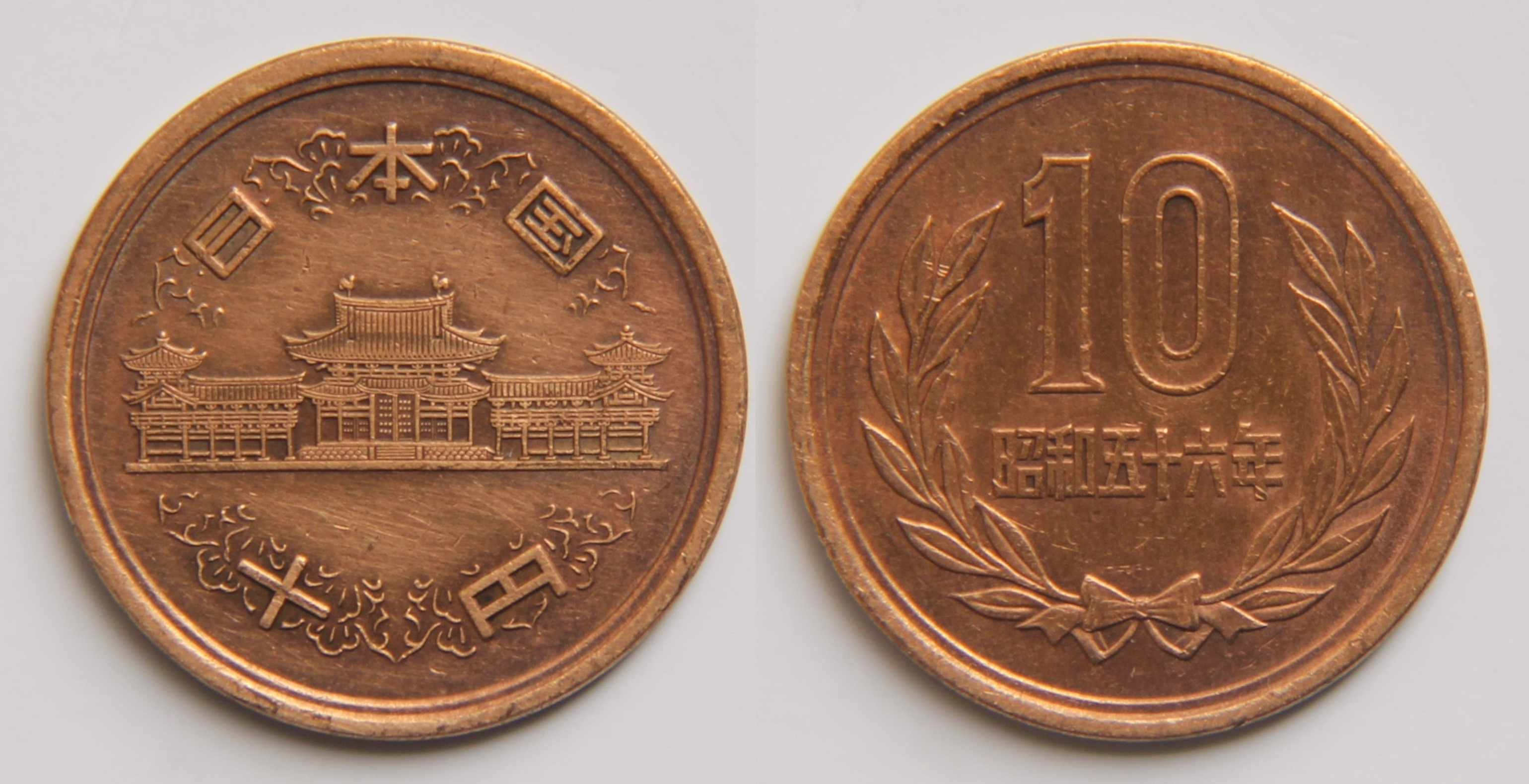
10 Japanese yen (1981)

== See also ==
- Coinage of Asia
- History of Chinese currency
