= Filing (metalworking) =

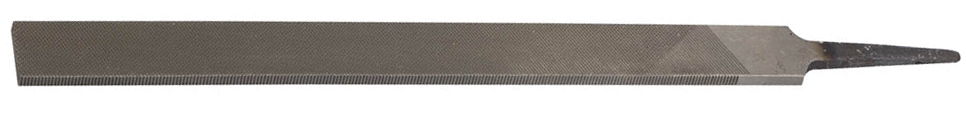
A flat file

Filing is a material removal process in manufacturing. Similar, depending on use, to both sawing and grinding in effect, it is functionally versatile, but used mostly for finishing operations, namely in deburring operations. Filing operations can be used on a wide range of materials as a finishing operation. Filing helps achieve workpiece function by removing some excess material and deburring the surface. Sandpaper may be used as a filing tool for other materials, such as wood.

== Band filing ==
Band filing takes place on a machine similar to a belt sander or band saw. Band files are sectioned similarly to a saw chain so that they can be made from stiff material, as they need to be to effectively remove material yet still work in a constant feed. A band filing operation can be used to remove small amounts of material with good accuracy. The cutting teeth of the file are arranged closely on the file and are used as part of a finishing process.

== Reciprocating filing ==
Reciprocating filing takes place on a flat surface where workpieces are fed into the file. The file teeth are angled so that material is removed on each downstroke of the tool. Chips removed from the workpiece fall through a cavity in front of the file.

== See also ==
- File (tool)
