= Will & Finck =

San Francisco cutlery and locksmithing company

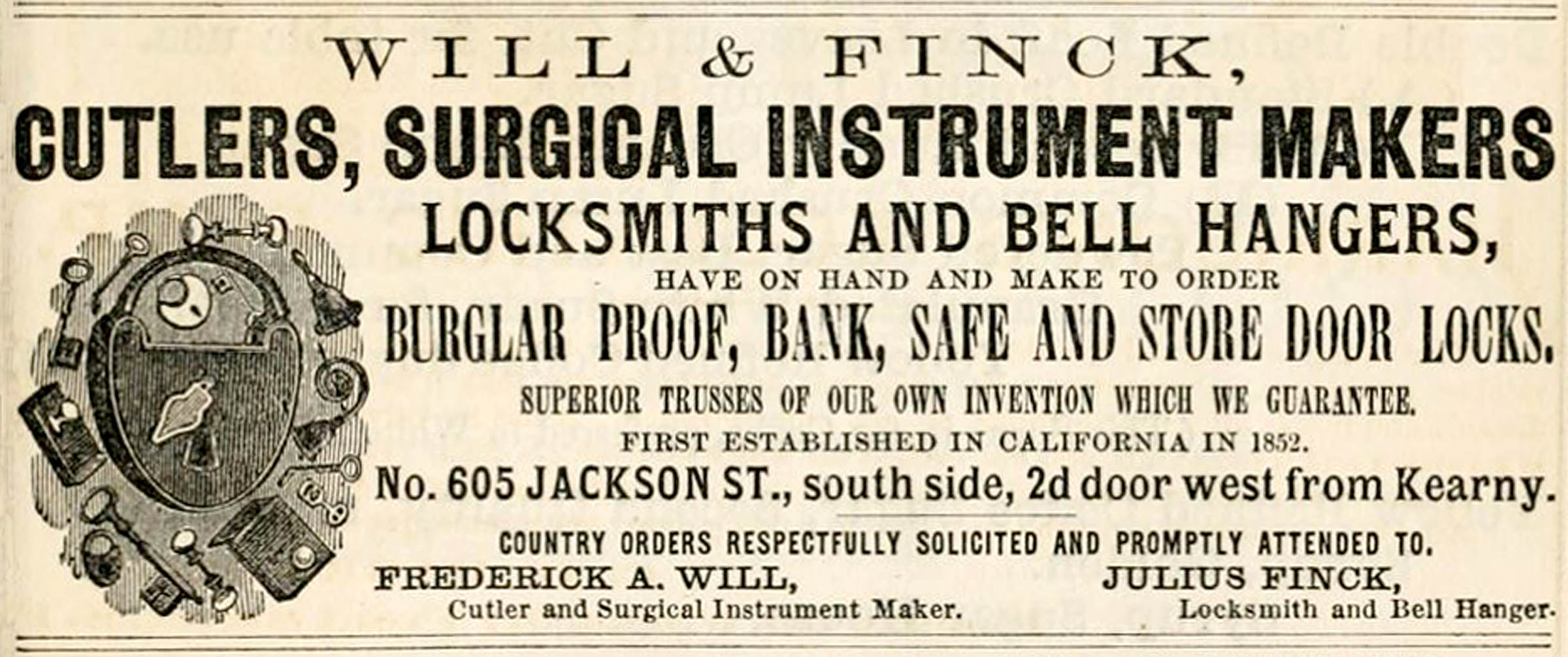
- Early advertisement for Will & Finck Company
- Type: Private company
- Industry: Cutlery
- Founded: 1837
- Founders: Frederick Adolph Will and Julius Finck
- Defunct: 1932
- Fate: Wound up after death of founders
- Headquarters: San Francisco, United States
- Area served: United States
- Products: Cutlery, scissors, surgical instruments, and locks

Will & Finck was a San Francisco company established in 1864 as cutlers, surgical instrument makers, locksmiths and bell hangers. The company closed in 1932.

== The founding partners ==
Frederick Adolph Will was born in Albany, New York in about 1837 and by 1860 was living and working as a cutler in the establishment of Hugh McConnell in San Francisco. He also worked with cutler and surgical instrument maker Frederick Kesmodel at 817 Kearny Street before taking out his own business listing in 1863 at 605 Jackson Street, the McConnell premises.

Julius Finck came from Baden, Germany, where he was born in about 1831. After several years working as a locksmith in New York City, in 1859 he formed a partnership in San Francisco with August Browning at 198 Kearny Street. In 1861 Browning & Finck were advertising their services as bell hangers as well as locksmiths.

In 1864 Will and Finck advertised their combined services operating at “No. 605 Jackson Street, south side, 2nd door west from Kearny.” They provided burglar-proof locks for banks, safes and stores, and guaranteed their “superior trusses of our own invention.”

== Making their name ==
Will & Finck exhibited at the 1865 fair of the San Francisco Mechanics’ Institute. The Examiner described their showcase: “We doubt if the most extensive establishments of Birmingham or Sheffield could surpass this brilliant display. This collection of Messrs. Will & Finck, embraces every article in the cutlery line from an ‘Arkansas toothpick’ of the largest dimensions to a delicate ladies pocket-knife –– and from a hotel annunciator to a champagne wire-cutter.” The reporter suggests that a Thanksgiving turkey would “fall to pieces at the sight of one of their lustrous, and finely tempered carving knives.” Participation in the Mechanics’ fair, the state fair and the San Joaquin fair of 1865 yielded six first prizes.

From 1865 they subtitled their ads “Excelsior Cutlers” at 613 Jackson Street, offering all kinds of table and pocket cutlery and informing the reading public they were “sole agents for Jackson’s Patent Hotel Annunciators.”

They began importing as well as manufacturing. Their product line expanded to surgical and dental instruments as well as barbers’ cutlery.

In 1870 Will & Finck opened a branch store at in the Occidental Hotel building at 110 Montgomery. Their products now included “Bar Goods of our own manufacture, constantly on hand: Lime Squeezers, Ice Picks, Lime Knives, Champagne Hooks and Corkscrews, in great variety.” They were sole agents for Heinisch's scissors and shears, and manufactured any cutlery to order. 1871 advertising added “All Kinds of Faro Tools” and offered bell-hanging services “in any part of the Pacific Coast.” The factory was at 821 Kearny Street, and the retail store at 140 Montgomery. Gaming supplies would become an important component of their business. They were considered the experts when an unlucky gambler took some losing dice for inspection and they found them to be loaded with mercury.

The company moved their “manufactory and elegant stock of goods from 821 Kearny to their large and new establishment, 869 Market Street…” in 1876.

In the 1880 San Francisco business directory, Will & Finck advertised in twelve categories: Barbers’ Supplies; Britannia Ware;Comb Makers;Corkscrew Manufacturers; Cutlers; Dentists’ Materials and Instruments; Electrical Apparatus Manufacturers; Faro Materials; Ivory Goods; Locksmiths; Surgical Instruments; Truss Manufacturers.

They advertised in directories from Alaska to Mexico. A more aggressive advertising program was underway in San Francisco newspapers, with promotions for specific items (baseball and boxing gloves, razors) and suggestions for Christmas giving,

== A change in direction ==
Frederick Will retired in 1883, and for the next twenty years a succession of names appeared as associated in the management of the company along with Julius Finck. These were Samuel W. Levy, Simon Blum, Morris Frederick, Henry L. Finck and Charles E. Wiggin. Levy had other business interests; Blum was his son-in-law. The others had worked at Will & Finck as managers but not craftsmen: Frederick as a manager for five years, H.L. Finck as a foreman and factory superintendent for four years, and Wiggin as a bookkeeper for fourteen years.

In 1886, Will & Finck moved to the Phelan Building where they would expand to fill premises at 818-820 Market Street as well as 15, 17, 19, 21 and 23 O’Farrell Street. In 1890, the store employed fifty-six people, and the factory fifty workmen. “When the firm moved to 818 Market Street, in addition to its famous cutlery, it added to its stock plated ware, fancy and leather goods, athletic and gymnasium goods, and barbers’ supplies. On taking the other five stores, and opening the great bazaar, artrooms were added, and the stock increased by gentlemen's furnishing goods, house furnishings, baby carriages and toys, until the firm now carries as large and as fine a line of goods as any bazaar in the United States.” In December of 1903, Will & Finck was proclaiming itself “Santa Claus’ Headquarters” offering “Xmas novelty” handkerchiefs and toy velocipedes. Still advertising sharpening and repair of cutlery, they had dropped “locksmith and bell hanger” from their ads.

== Patents ==
All are United States patents except one.

- 1872 Apr 3 (F.A. Will & J. Finck) – No. 125,922: Improvement in Tool Handles
- 1872 Apr 23 (F.A. Will & J. Finck) – No. 125921: Clasp for Side-Arms
- 1872 Sep 3 (F.A. Will) – No. 131,141: Improvement in Stems and Standards for Fragile Ware
- 1872 Dec 3 (F.A. Will & J. Finck) – No. 133,610: Speaking Tubes
- 1877 Oct 30 (F.A. Will & J. Finck) – No. 196,612: Skewer-Puller
- 1885 Jul 28 (J. Finck) – No. 323,308: Door Opener
- 1885 Oct 13 (J. Finck) – No. 328,114: Door Operating Device
- 1886 May 11 (J. Finck) – No. 341,566: Automatic Electric Gas-Lighter
- 1890 Jan 7 (J. Finck) – No. 418,868: Annunciator
- 1891 Oct 6 (J. Finck) – No. 460,820: Door Opener and Closer
- 1892 Mar 1 (J. Finck) – No. 469,896: Cash and Package Carrier
- 1892 Mar 22 (J. Finck) – No. 471,325: Cash and Package Carrier
- 1895 May 4 (M. Fredrick) - GB 189413341: Tongue Cleaner Attachment for Tooth Brushes
- 1903 June 2 (J. Finck& H. Herbstritt) – No. 729,853: Mouthpiece for Speaking Tubes

== The end of an era ==
From 1893 to 1904, Julius Finck was president of the Will & Finck Company and in 1905 he proposed to retire. In January a news item appeared that an offer had been made to ”all the stockholders of Will & Finck” and the sale was likely to be concluded that day. A couple of weeks later, it was reported that the Will & Finck department store had “gone out of existence and been absorbed by the Emporium.” In March, the “Will & Finck machine factory including lease and fixtures” was auctioned off, and the retail stock being advertised at half price.

== Out but not down ==
In April, an announcement was published that Will & Finck was “Now at 57 Third St.” with a new factory at 72 Jessie Street. Listed as management in the 1905 San Francisco city directory were Henry L. Finck and William F. Litzius. Henry L. Finck was a brother of Julius. Litzius had been with the company for twenty-five years in various capacities – clerk, salesman, secretary. In 1905 he made the controversial move of petitioning to change his surname to Will. Company founder Frederick A. Will bitterly and unsuccessfully fought this adoption of his name.

Just days after the earthquake in April 1906, Henry Finck died. Julius came out of retirement briefly and the company resumed business first at the Finck residence and later at 1942 and then 1686 Market Street, all by the end of 1906. Will & Finck would operate at 1686 Market until 1929.

Advertising as a purveyor of cutlery, barbers’ supplies and sporting goods, William F. Will (formerly Litzius) carried on the company under the Will & Finck name until his death on Christmas Day, 1932.

== Fate of the founders ==
“Frederick A. Will, pioneer of this city, last of the charter members of the famous military organization ‘The Nationals’ and founder of the cutlery and sporting goods house of Will & Finck” died in 1912. He was seventy-five.

“The will of Julius Finck, pioneer cutlery merchant and sporting goods man of this city, and former member of the firm of Will and Finck, was filed for probate today.” Finck died March 20, 1914, at age eighty-two.
