= James Bowie =

American military officer, landowner and slave trader (1796–1836)

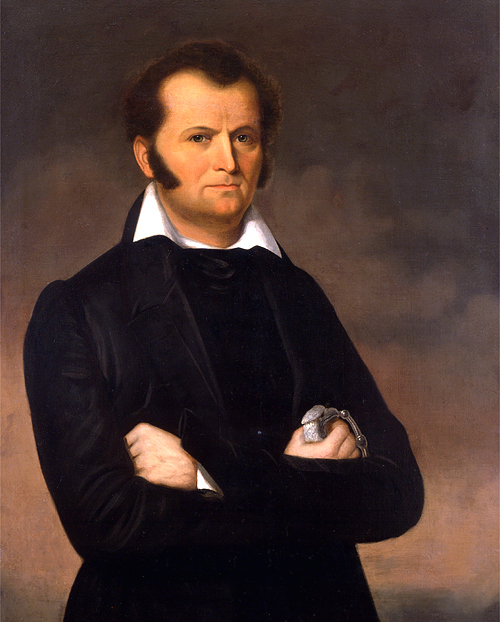
- Bowie c. 1831–1834
- Born: April 10, 1796; Logan County, Kentucky, U.S.
- Died: March 6, 1836 (aged 39); San Antonio, Republic of Texas
- Military career
- Allegiance: Republic of Texas
- Service years: 1835–1836
- Rank: Colonel
- Nickname: Santiago Bowie
- Unit: Texian Militia
- Commands: The Alamo; San Antonio
- Conflicts: Texas Revolution; Battle of Nacogdoches; Battle of Concepción; Grass Fight; Battle of the Alamo

James Bowie (/ˈbuːi/ BOO-ee) (Note: Bowie's surname was pronounced /ˈbuːi/ BOO-ee. Some reference works, however, refer to an incorrect alternate pronunciation /ˈboʊi/ BOH-ee.) (April 10, 1796 – March 6, 1836) was an American military officer, landowner and slave trader who played a prominent role in the Texas Revolution. Bowie was among the Americans who died at the Battle of the Alamo. Stories of him as a fighter and frontiersman, both real and fictitious, have made him a legendary figure in Texas history and a folk hero of American culture.

Born in Logan County, Kentucky, Bowie spent most of his life in Louisiana, where he was raised and where he later worked as a land speculator. His rise to fame began in 1827 on reports of the Sandbar Fight near present-day Vidalia, Louisiana. What started as a duel between two other men deteriorated into a mêlée in which Bowie, having been shot and stabbed, killed the sheriff of Rapides Parish with a large knife. This, and other stories of Bowie's prowess with a knife, led to the widespread popularity of the Bowie knife.

Bowie enlarged his reputation during the Texas Revolution. After moving to Texas in 1830, Bowie became a Mexican citizen and married Ursula Veramendi, the daughter of Juan Martín de Veramendi, the Mexican vice-governor of the province. Bowie led an expedition to find the lost San Saba mine, during which his small party repelled an attack by a large Native American raiding party. This enhanced his reputation, although they did not find the mine.

At the outbreak of the Texas Revolution, Bowie joined the Texas militia, leading forces at the Battle of Concepción and the Grass Fight. In January 1836, he arrived at the Alamo, where he commanded the volunteer forces until an illness left him bedridden. Bowie died on March 6, 1836, with the other Alamo defenders. Despite conflicting accounts of his death, the "most popular, and probably the most accurate" accounts maintain that he died in his bed while defending himself against Mexican soldiers.

== Early life ==
According to his older brother, John, James Bowie was born in Logan County, Kentucky, on April 10, 1796 (Historical marker: 36° 46' 25"N 86° 42' 10"W). In his 1948 book, Bowie Knife, historian Raymond Thorp gives Bowie's birth date as April 10 but does not support it with any documentation. Bowie's surname was pronounced /ˈbuːi/ BOO-ee. (Some reference works give the incorrect alternate pronunciation /ˈboʊi/ BOH-ee). His ancestry was predominantly Scottish and English.

Bowie was the ninth of ten children born to Reason (or Rezin) and Elve Ap-Catesby (née Jones, or Johns) Bowie. His father was wounded while fighting in the American Revolutionary War, and in 1782 he married Elve, the young woman who nursed him back to health. The Bowies first settled in Georgia and then moved to Kentucky. At the time of Bowie's birth, his father owned eight slaves, eleven head of cattle, seven horses, and one stud horse. The following year, the family acquired 200 acres (80 ha) along the Red River. They sold that property in 1800 and relocated to what is now Missouri. In 1802, they moved south to Spanish Louisiana, where they settled on Bushley Bayou in what soon became Rapides Parish.

The family moved again in 1809, settling on Bayou Teche in Louisiana before finding a permanent home in Opelousas in 1812. Raised on the frontier, the Bowie children worked from a young age, helping to clear the land and plant and cultivate crops. All the children learned to read and write in English, but James and his elder brother Rezin could also read, write, and speak Spanish and French fluently. The children learned to survive on the frontier, learning how to fish, butcher meat, and run a farm and plantation. James Bowie became proficient with pistol, rifle, and knife, and had a reputation for fearlessness. When he was a boy, one of his Native American friends taught him to rope alligators.

In late 1814, in response to General Andrew Jackson's plea for volunteers to fight the British in the War of 1812, James and Rezin enlisted in the Louisiana militia. The Bowie brothers arrived in New Orleans too late to participate in the fighting. After mustering out of the militia, Bowie settled in Rapides Parish. He supported himself by sawing planks and lumber, and floating them down the bayou for sale. In June 1819, he joined the Long Expedition, an effort to liberate Texas from Spanish rule. The group encountered little resistance and, after capturing Nacogdoches, declared Texas an independent republic. The extent of Bowie's participation is unclear, but he returned to Louisiana before the invasion was repelled by Spanish troops.

== Land speculator and slave smuggler ==
Shortly before the senior Bowie died, circa 1820, he gave ten servants and horses and cattle to both James and Rezin. For the next seven years, the brothers worked together to develop several large estates in Lafourche Parish and Opelousas. Louisiana's population was growing rapidly, and the brothers hoped to take advantage of its rising land prices by speculating in land. Without the capital required to buy large tracts, in 1818 they entered into a partnership with pirate Jean Lafitte to raise money. By then, the United States had outlawed the importation of slaves from Africa, and most southern states allowed anyone who informed on a slave trader to receive half of what the imported slaves would earn at auction as a reward. Bowie made three trips to Lafitte's compound on Galveston Island. On each occasion, he bought smuggled slaves and took them directly to a customhouse to inform on his own actions. When the customs officers offered the slaves for auction, Bowie purchased them and received back half the price he had paid, as allowed by the state laws. He could legally transport the slaves and resell them at a greater market value in New Orleans or areas farther up the Mississippi River. Using this scheme, the brothers collected $65,000 to use for their land speculation.

In 1825, the two brothers joined with their younger brother, Stephen, to buy Acadia Plantation near Thibodaux. Within two years, they had established there the first steam mill in Louisiana for grinding sugar cane. The plantation became known as a model operation, but on February 12, 1831, they sold it and 65 slaves for $90,000 (~$3.2 million in 2025). With their profits, James and Rezin bought a plantation in Arkansas.

In the late 1820s, Bowie and his brother John were involved in a major Arkansas court case over land speculation. When the United States purchased the Louisiana Territory in 1803, it promised to honor all former land grant claims. For the next 20 years, efforts were made to establish who owned what land. In May 1824, Congress authorized the superior courts of each territory to hear suits from those who claimed they had been overlooked. In late 1827, the Arkansas Superior Court received 126 claims from residents who claimed to have purchased land in former Spanish grants from the Bowie brothers. Although the Superior Court originally confirmed most of those claims, the decisions were reversed in February 1831, after further research showed that the land had never belonged to the Bowies and that the original land grant documentation had been forged. The U.S. Supreme Court upheld the reversal in 1833. When the disgruntled purchasers considered suing the Bowies, they discovered that the documents in the case had been removed from the court. Left without evidence, they declined to pursue the lawsuit.

== Bowie knife ==
Bowie became internationally famous as a result of a feud with Norris Wright, the sheriff of Rapides Parish. Bowie had supported Wright's opponent in the race for sheriff, and Wright, a bank director, had been instrumental in turning down a Bowie loan application. After a confrontation in Alexandria one afternoon, Wright fired a shot at Bowie, after which Bowie resolved to carry his hunting knife at all times. The knife he carried had a blade that was 9.25 inches (23.5 cm) long and 1.5 inches (3.8 cm) wide.

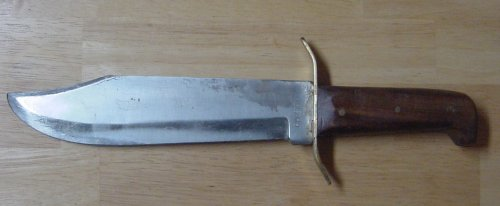
A Bowie knife

The following year, on September 19, 1827, Bowie and Wright attended a duel on a sandbar outside of Natchez, Mississippi. Bowie supported duelist Samuel Levi Wells III, while Wright supported Wells's opponent, Dr. Thomas Harris Maddox. The duelists each fired two shots and, because neither man had been injured, resolved their duel with a handshake. Other members of the groups, who had various reasons for disliking each other, began fighting. Bowie was shot in the hip, and, after regaining his feet, he drew a knife, described as a butcher knife, and charged his attacker. The man hit Bowie over the head with his empty pistol, breaking the pistol and knocking Bowie to the ground. Wright shot at and missed the prone Bowie, who returned fire and possibly hit Wright. Wright drew his sword cane and impaled Bowie. When Wright attempted to retrieve his blade by placing his foot on Bowie's chest and tugging, Bowie pulled him down and disemboweled Wright with his large knife. Wright died instantly. Bowie, with Wright's sword still protruding from his chest, was shot again and stabbed by another member of the group. The doctors who had been present for the duel removed the bullets and patched Bowie's other wounds.

Newspapers picked up the story and named it the Sandbar Fight, describing in detail Bowie's fighting prowess and his unusual knife. Witness accounts agreed that Bowie did not attack first, and the other combatants had focused their attack on Bowie because "they considered him the most dangerous man among their opposition." Bowie's reputation as a superb knife fighter was set across the South.

Scholars disagree as to whether the knife Bowie used in this fight was the same design as the blade now known as a Bowie knife, which was fabricated by a knifemaker in Arkansas who also created another renowned large blade, the Arkansas toothpick. There are multiple accounts of the design and fabrication of the first Bowie knife. Some claim that Bowie designed it, while others attribute the design to noted knife makers of the time. In a letter to The Planter's Advocate, his brother Rezin claimed to have designed the knife. Many Bowie family members, as well as "most authorities on the Bowie knife tend to believe it was invented by" Rezin. However, Rezin Bowie's grandchildren said that Rezin only supervised his blacksmith, who was the designer of the knife.

After the Sandbar Fight and subsequent battles in which Bowie used his knife in self-defense, the Bowie knife became very popular. Many craftsmen and manufacturers made their own versions, and major cities of the Old Southwest had "Bowie knife schools" that taught "the art of cut, thrust, and parry." Bowie's fame, and that of his knife, spread to Great Britain, and by the early 1830s, many British manufacturers were producing Bowie knives for shipment to the United States. The design of the knife continued to evolve, but a Bowie knife is now generally considered to have a blade 8.25 inches (21.0 cm) long and 1.25 inches (3.2 cm) wide, with a curved point, a "sharp false edge cut from both sides", and a cross-guard to protect the user's hands.

== Establishment in Texas ==
In 1828, after recovering from the wounds he received in the Sandbar Fight, Bowie decided to move to Coahuila y Texas, at that time a state in the Mexican federation. The 1824 Constitution of Mexico banned religions other than Catholicism and gave preference to Mexican citizens in receiving land. Bowie was baptized into the Catholic faith in San Antonio on April 28, 1828, sponsored by the alcalde (chief administrator) of the town, Juan Martín de Veramendi, and his wife, Josefa Navarro. For the next 18 months, Bowie traveled through Louisiana and Mississippi. In 1829, he became engaged to Cecilia Wells, but she died in Alexandria on September 29, two weeks before they were to be married.

On January 1, 1830, Bowie left Louisiana to live in Texas, permanently. He stopped at Nacogdoches, at Jared E. Groce's farm on the Brazos River, and in San Felipe, where he presented a letter of introduction from Thomas F. McKinney, one of the Old Three Hundred colonists, to Stephen F. Austin. On February 20, Bowie swore an oath of allegiance to Mexico and proceeded to San Antonio de Bexar. At the time, the city was known as Bexar and had a population of 2500, mostly of Mexican descent. Bowie's fluency in Spanish helped him to get established in the area.

Bowie was elected a commander of the Texas Rangers later that year, with the rank of colonel. Although the Rangers would not be organized officially until 1835, Austin had founded the group by hiring 30 men to keep the peace and protect the colonists from attacks by hostile Native Americans. Other areas assembled similar volunteer militias. Bowie commanded a group of volunteers.

Bowie renounced his American citizenship and became a Mexican citizen on September 30, 1830, after promising to establish textile mills in the state of Coahuila y Tejas. To fulfill his promise, Bowie entered into partnership with Veramendi to build cotton and wool mills in Saltillo. With his citizenship assured, Bowie had the right to buy up to 11 leagues of public land. He convinced 14 or 15 other citizens to apply for land and transfer it to him, giving him 700,000 acres (280,000 ha) for speculation. Bowie may have been the first to induce settlers to apply for empresario grants, which could be sold in bulk to speculators, as Bowie had. The Mexican government passed laws in 1834 and 1835 that stopped much of the land speculation.

On April 25, 1831, Bowie married nineteen-year-old Maria Ursula de Veramendi, the daughter of his business partner, who had become the vice governor of the province. Several days before the ceremony, he signed a dowry contract promising to pay his new bride 15,000 pesos (approximately $15,000 then, or $454,000 today) in cash or property within two years of the marriage. At the time, Bowie claimed to have a net worth of $223,000 ($6,740,000 today), mostly in land of questionable title. Bowie also lied about his age, claiming to be 30 rather than 35.

The couple built a house in San Antonio, on land Veramendi had given them near the San José Mission. After a short time, however, they moved into the Veramendi Palace to live with Ursula's parents, who supplied them with spending money. The couple had two children, Marie Elve (b. March 20, 1832) and James Veramendi Bowie (b. July 18, 1833).

Maria Ursula, her parents, and both children died in September 1833 during a cholera epidemic that swept through the South and along major waterways.

Rezin Bowie's account of an Indian fight in Texas in 1831 [with 1833 woodcut illustration]

== Los Almagres Mine ==
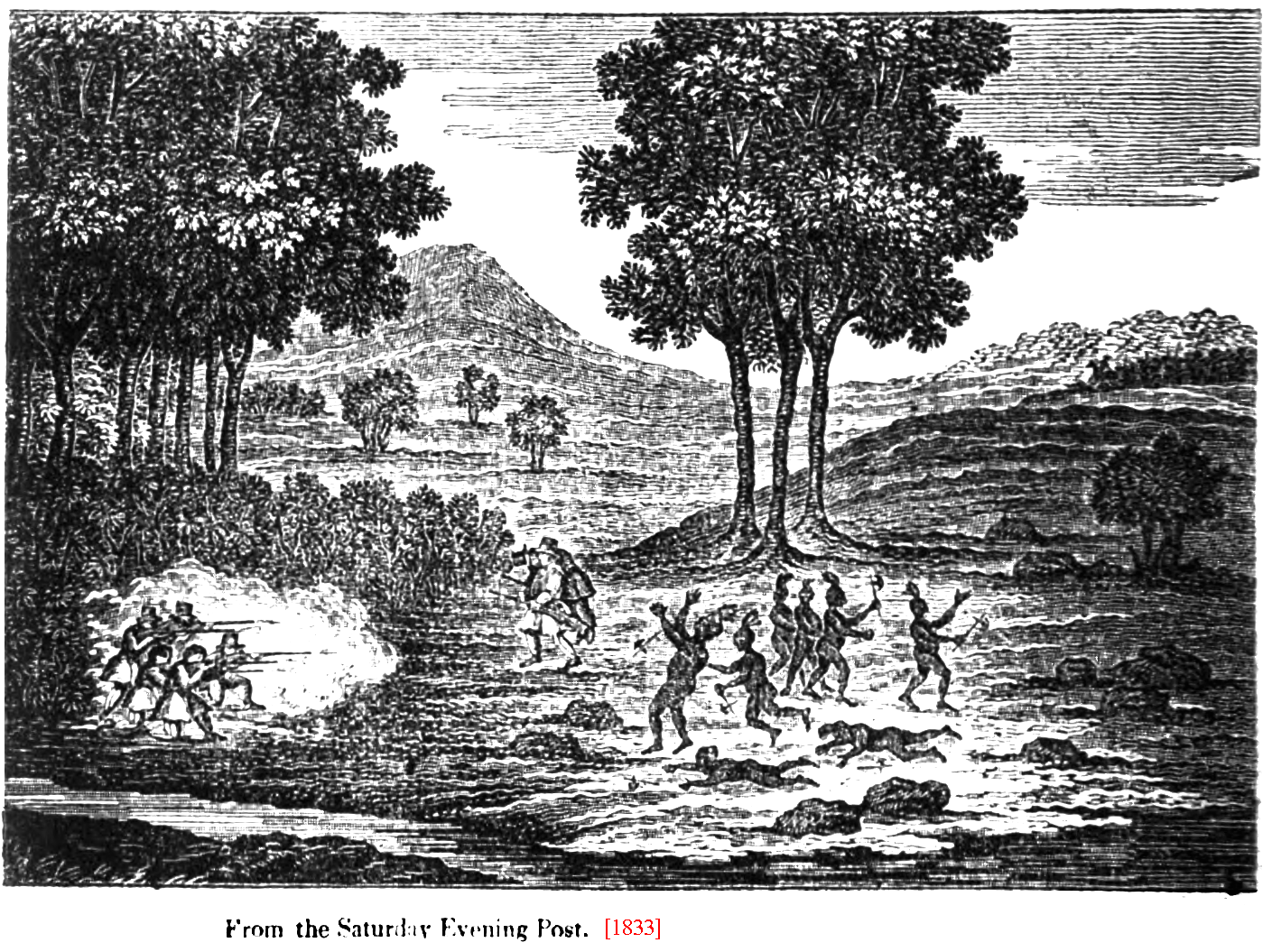
Woodcut illustrating Rezin Bowie's 1833 account of an 1831 Indian fight in Texas appearing in the Saturday Evening Post and Atkinson's Casket

Shortly after his marriage, Bowie became fascinated with the story of the "lost" Los Almagres Mine (also known as the lost San Saba Mine and the lost Bowie Mine), said to be northwest of San Antonio, near the ruin of the Spanish Mission Santa Cruz de San Saba. According to legend, the mine had been operated by local Native Americans before being seized by the Spanish. After Mexico won independence from Spain, government interest in mining waned. A number of native groups roamed the area, including Comanche, Lipan Apache, Tawakoni, and Tonkawa. Without government troops to keep hostile natives at bay, mining and mineral exploration were impossible. Some believed that the Lipan took over the mine after the Mexican citizens left the area.

After obtaining permission from the Mexican government to mount an expedition into Indian territory to search for the legendary silver mine, Bowie, his brother Rezin, and ten others set out for San Saba on November 2, 1831. Six miles (10 km) from their goal, the group stopped to negotiate with a large raiding party—reportedly more than 120 Tawakoni and Waco, plus another 40 Caddo. The attempts at parley failed, and Bowie and his group fought for their lives for the next 13 hours. When the raiding party finally retreated, Bowie reportedly had lost only one man, while more than 40 Indians had been killed and 30 were wounded. In the meantime, a party of friendly Comanche rode into San Antonio bringing word of the raiding party, which outnumbered the Bowie expedition by 14 to 1. The citizens of San Antonio believed the members of the Bowie expedition must have perished, and Ursula Bowie began wearing widow's weeds.

To the town's surprise, the surviving members of the group returned to San Antonio on December 6. Bowie's report of the expedition, written in Spanish, was printed in several newspapers, further establishing his reputation. He set out again the following month, with a larger force, but returned home empty-handed after 2 1/2 months of searching.

Bowie never talked about his exploits, despite his increasing fame. Captain William Y. Lacey, who spent eight months living in the wilderness with Bowie, described him as a humble man who never used profanity or vulgarities.

James Bowie's 1831 report of Indian fight near San Saba from Brown's History of Texas, 1892

== Texas Revolution ==
=== Texan rumblings ===
Between 1830 and 1832, the Mexican Congress passed a series of laws that seemed to discriminate against Anglo colonists in the province of Coahuila y Tejas, increasing tension between the Anglo citizenry and Mexican officials. In response to the rumblings, Mexican troops established military posts in several locations within the province, including San Antonio de Béxar. Although much of the military supported the administration of President Anastasio Bustamante, Antonio López de Santa Anna led an insurrection against him in 1832. Anglo colonists in Texas supported Santa Anna and General José Antonio Mexía, who led soldiers into Texas to oust commanders loyal to Bustamante.

In July 1832, after hearing that the Mexican army commander in Nacogdoches, José de las Piedras, had demanded that all residents in his area surrender their arms, Bowie cut short a visit to Natchez to return to Texas. On August 2, 1832, he joined a group of other Texans and marched into Nacogdoches to "present their demands" to Piedras. Before the group reached the building housing the town officials, they were attacked by a force of 100 Mexican cavalry. The Texans returned fire and the Battle of Nacogdoches began. After the cavalry retreated, they laid siege to the garrison. After a second battle, in which Piedras lost 33 men, the Mexican army evacuated during the night. Bowie and 18 companions ambushed the fleeing army and, after Piedras fled, marched the soldiers back to Nacogdoches. Bowie later served as a delegate to the Convention of 1833, which formally requested that Texas become its own state within the Mexican federation.

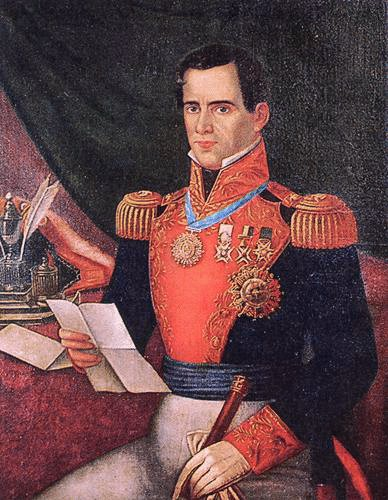
Antonio López de Santa Anna, president of Mexico, led the Mexican Army into Texas.

Several months later, a cholera epidemic struck Texas. Fearing the disease would reach San Antonio, Bowie sent his pregnant wife and their daughter to the family estate in Monclova, in the company of her parents and brother. The cholera epidemic struck Monclova, and between September 6 and September 14, Ursula, their children, her brother, and her parents all died of the disease. Bowie, on business in Natchez, did not hear of his family's deaths until November. From then on, he drank heavily and became "careless in his dress."

The following year, the Mexican government passed new laws allowing sale of land in Texas, and Bowie returned to land speculation. He was appointed a land commissioner and was tasked with promoting settlement in the area purchased by John T. Mason. His appointment ended in May 1835, when President Antonio López de Santa Anna abolished the Coahuila y Tejas government and ordered the arrest of all Texans (including Bowie) doing business in Monclova. Bowie was forced to flee Monclova and return to the Anglo areas of Texas.

The Anglos in Texas began agitating for war against Santa Anna, and Bowie worked with William B. Travis, the leader of the War Party, to gain support. Bowie visited several Native American villages in East Texas in an attempt to persuade the reluctant tribes to fight against the Mexican government. Santa Anna responded to the rumblings by ordering large numbers of Mexican troops to Texas.

=== Battle of Concepción ===
The Texas Revolution began on October 2, 1835, with the Battle of Gonzales. Stephen F. Austin formed an army of 500 men to march on the Mexican forces in San Antonio with the cannon that had precipitated the fight. The name "Texian Army" is sometimes applied to this militia. On October 22, Austin asked James W. Fannin and Bowie, now a colonel in the volunteer militia, to scout the area around the missions of San Francisco de la Espada and San José y San Miguel de Aguayo and find supplies for the volunteer forces. The scouting party left with 92 men, many of them members of the New Orleans Grays, who had just arrived in Texas. After discovering a good defensive position near Mission Concepción, the group requested that Austin's army join them.

On the foggy morning of October 28, Mexican General Domingo Ugartechea led a force of 300 infantry and cavalry soldiers and two small cannons against the Texian forces. Although the Mexican army was able to get within 200 yards (183 m), the Texian defensive position protected them from fire. When the Mexicans stopped to reload their cannon, the Texians climbed a bluff and picked off some of the soldiers. The stalemate ended shortly after Bowie led a charge to seize one of the Mexican cannons, at that time only 80 yards (73 m) away. Ugartechea retreated with his troops, ending the Battle of Concepción. One Texian and ten Mexican troops had been killed. One of the men under Bowie's command during the battle later praised him "as a born leader, never needlessly spending a bullet or imperiling a life, who repeatedly admonished... Keep under cover boys, and reserve your fire; we haven't a man to spare."

=== Grass Fight and commission difficulties ===
An hour after the battle ended, Austin arrived with the rest of the Texian army to begin a siege of San Antonio de Béxar, where General Martín Perfecto de Cós, the overall commander of Mexican forces in Texas, and his troops were garrisoned. Two days later, Bowie resigned from Austin's army because he did not have an official commission in the army, and he disliked the "minor tasks of scouting and spying".

On November 3, 1835, Texas declared itself an independent state, and a provisional government was formed, with Henry Smith of Brazoria elected provisional governor. Austin asked to be relieved of his command of the army, and Sam Houston was named army chief. Edward Burleson was chosen as temporary commander of the troops in San Antonio. At some point, Bowie appeared before the council and spoke for an hour, asking for a commission. The council refused his request, probably because of lingering animosity over his land dealings.

Houston offered Bowie a commission as an officer on his staff, but Bowie rejected the opportunity, explaining that he wanted to be in the midst of the fighting. Instead, Bowie enlisted in the army as a private under Fannin. He distinguished himself again in the Grass Fight on November 26. Cós had sent approximately 187 men to cut grass for his horses. As they returned to San Antonio, Bowie took 60 mounted men to intercept the party, which they believed carried valuable cargo. The Mexican troops quickened their pace in hopes of reaching the safety of the city, but Bowie and his cavalry chased them. At the end of the fight, the Texians had two wounded men but had captured many horses and mules.

Shortly after Bowie left San Antonio, Ben Milam led an assault on the city. In the ensuing fighting, the Texians suffered only a few casualties, including Milam, while the Mexican army lost many troops to death and desertion. Cós surrendered and returned to Mexico, taking with him the last Mexican troops in Texas. Believing the war was over, many of the Texian volunteers left the army and returned to their families. In early January 1836, Bowie went to San Felipe and asked the council to allow him to recruit a regiment. He was turned down again, because he "was not an officer of the government nor army."

=== Battle of the Alamo ===
After Houston received word that Santa Anna was leading a large force to San Antonio, Bowie offered to lead volunteers to defend the Alamo from the expected attack. He arrived with 30 men on January 19. They found a force of 104 men with a few weapons and a few cannons, but not many supplies and little gunpowder. Houston knew that there were not enough men to hold the fort in an attack, and he gave Bowie authority to remove the artillery and blow up the fortification. Bowie and the Alamo commander, James C. Neill, decided they did not have enough oxen to move the artillery, and they did not want to destroy the fortress. On January 26, one of Bowie's men, James Bonham, organized a rally that passed a resolution in favor of holding the Alamo. Bonham signed the resolution first; Bowie's signature came second.

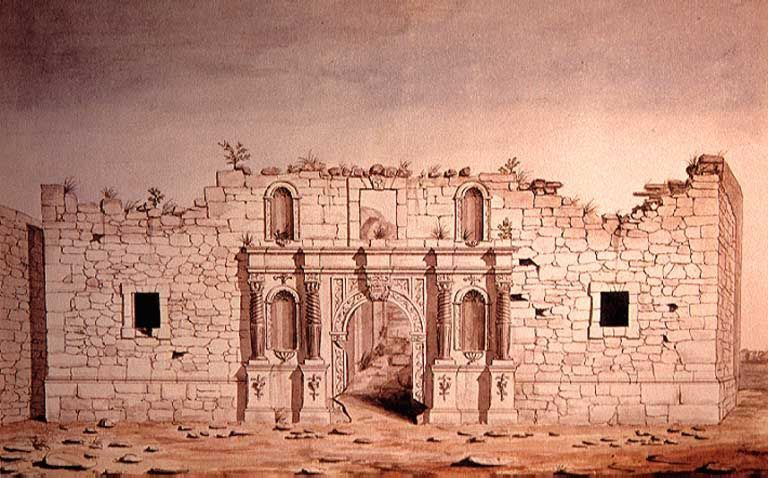
The Alamo, c. 1847

Because of Bowie's fluency in Spanish and his connections through his marriage, the predominantly Mexican population of San Antonio often furnished him with information about the movements of the Mexican army. After learning that Santa Anna had 4,500 troops and was heading for the city, Bowie wrote several letters to the provisional government asking for help in defending the Alamo, especially "men, money, rifles, and cannon powder". In another letter, to Governor Smith, he reiterated his view that "the salvation of Texas depends in great measure on keeping Béxar out of the hands of the enemy. It serves as the frontier picquet guard, and if it were in the possession of Santa Anna, there is no stronghold from which to repel him in his march toward the Sabine." The letter to Smith ended, "Colonel Neill and myself have come to the solemn resolution that we will rather die in these ditches than give it up to the enemy."

On February 3, Davy Crockett appeared with thirty Tennesseans. Neill went on furlough on February 11 to visit his sick family, leaving Travis, a member of the regular army, in command. Bowie was older than Travis, had a better reputation and considered himself a colonel, thus outranking Travis, who was a lieutenant colonel. Bowie refused to answer to Travis, who called an election for the men to choose their own commander. They chose Bowie, infuriating Travis. Bowie celebrated his appointment by getting very drunk and causing havoc in San Antonio, releasing all prisoners in the local jails and harassing citizens. Travis was disgusted, but two days later the men agreed to a joint command: Bowie would command the volunteers, and Travis would command the regular army and the volunteer cavalry.

On February 23, the bells of San Fernando sounded the alarm for the approach of the Mexicans. Travis ordered all the Texan forces into the Alamo. Bowie hurried to gather provisions and herd cattle into the Alamo compound. Fearing for the safety of his wife's relatives in San Antonio, Bowie invited her cousins, Getrudis Navarro and Juana Navarro Alsbury, as well as Alsbury's 18-month-old son, Alijo Perez Jr., to stay inside the walls of the Alamo. Bowie also brought several black servants, some of whom worked at the Veramendi Palace, into the security of the Alamo fortress. Bowie had been ill, and two doctors, including the fort surgeon, were unable to diagnose his illness. Travis became the sole commander of the forces when Bowie was confined to bed. Santa Anna and his army began a siege of the Alamo on February 24. The Mexican army raised a red flag to warn the defenders that no quarter would be given.

Bowie and Travis began sending out couriers with pleas for provisions and assistance. On February 25, Travis sent Juan Seguin, on Bowie's horse, to recruit reinforcements, and 32 additional men arrived. On February 26, Crockett reported that Bowie, though suffering from his condition, continued to crawl from his bed around noon every day and present himself to the Alamo's inhabitants, which much boosted the morale of his comrades. Thirty-five years after the Alamo fell, a reporter identified Louis "Moses" Rose as the only man to have "deserted" the Texian forces at the Alamo. According to the reporter's version of Rose's account, when Travis realized that the Mexican army would likely prevail, he drew a line in the sand and asked those willing to die for the cause to cross the line. At Bowie's request, Crockett and several others carried his cot over the line, leaving Rose alone on the other side. After this article appeared, several other eyewitnesses confirmed the account, but because Rose was deceased the story can only be authenticated by the word of the reporter, who admitted to embellishing other articles, "and thus many historians refuse to believe it."

Bowie perished with the rest of the Alamo defenders when the Mexicans attacked on March 6. Most of the noncombatants in the fort, including Bowie's relatives, survived. Santa Anna ordered the alcalde of San Antonio, Francisco Antonio Ruiz, to confirm the identities of Bowie, Travis, and Crockett. After first ordering that Bowie be buried, as he was too brave a man to be burned like a dog, Santa Anna later had Bowie's body placed with those of the other Texians on the funeral pyre.

When Bowie's mother was informed of his death, she calmly stated, "I'll wager no wounds were found in his back." Various eyewitnesses to the battle gave conflicting accounts of Bowie's death. A newspaper article claimed that a Mexican soldier saw Bowie carried from his room on his cot, alive, after the conclusion of the battle. The soldier maintained that Bowie castigated a Mexican officer in fluent Spanish, and the officer ordered Bowie's tongue cut out and his still-breathing body thrown onto the funeral pyre. This account has been disputed by numerous other witnesses, and it is thought to have been invented by the reporter. Other witnesses maintained that they saw several Mexican soldiers enter Bowie's room, bayonet him, and carry him, alive, from the room. Various other stories circulated. Some witnesses claimed that Bowie shot himself. Others said he was killed by soldiers while too weak to lift his head. Alcalde Ruiz said that Bowie was found "dead in his bed." According to Wallace O Chariton, the "most popular, and probably the most accurate" version is that Bowie died on his cot, "back braced against the wall, and using his pistols and his famous knife." One year after the battle, Juan Seguin returned to the Alamo and gathered the remaining ashes from the funeral pyre. He placed these in a coffin inscribed with the names of Bowie, Travis, and Crockett. The ashes were interred at the Cathedral of San Fernando.

== Legacy ==
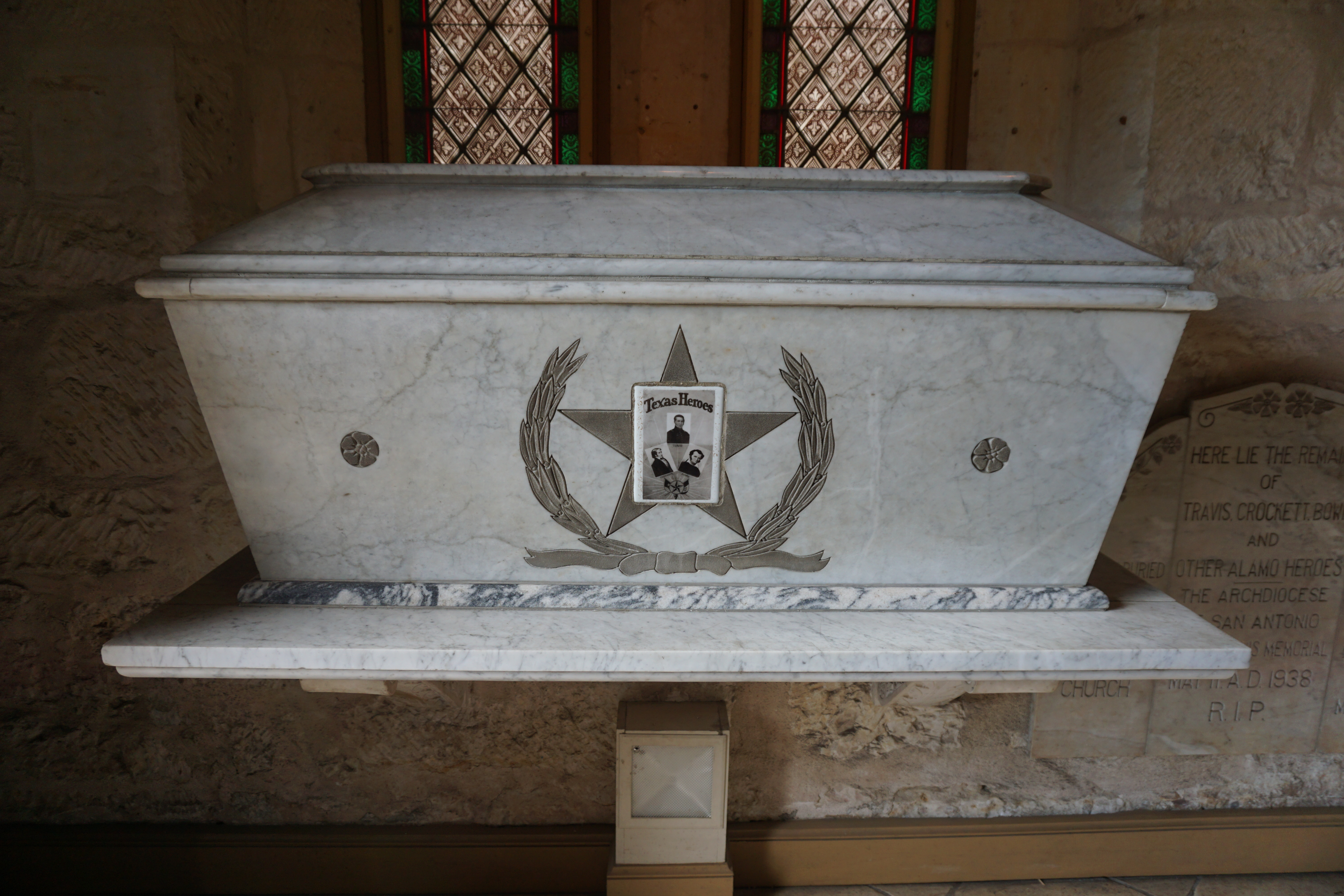
Sarcophagus in the Cathedral of San Fernando containing Bowie's ashes

Despite his continual claims of wealth, Bowie's estate was found to be very small. His possessions were auctioned for only $99.50. His larger legacy is his position as "one of the legendary characters of the American frontier." Bowie left a "frustratingly sparse paper trail" of his life, and for many "where history failed, the legends prevailed." Although Bowie's name and knife were well known during his lifetime, his legend grew after October 1852, when DeBow's Review published an article written by his brother, John Jones Bowie, called, "Early Life in the Southwest—The Bowies." The article focused primarily on the exploits of Jim Bowie. Beginning with that article, "romanticized stories" about Bowie began appearing in national press. In many cases, "these stories were pure melodrama, with Bowie rescuing some naïve planter's son or damsel in distress."

Jim Bowie was inducted posthumously into the Blade Magazine Cutlery Hall of Fame at the 1988 Blade Show in Atlanta, Georgia, in recognition of the impact that his eponymous design had upon generations of knife makers and cutlery companies.

A number of films have depicted the events of the Battle of the Alamo, in which Bowie has appeared as a character.

From 1956 to 1958, Bowie was the subject of a CBS television series, The Adventures of Jim Bowie, which was primarily set in 1830s Louisiana, although later episodes ventured into the Mexican province of Texas. The show, which starred Scott Forbes as Jim Bowie, was based on the 1946 novel Tempered Blade.

Rock star David Bowie, who was born David Robert Jones, adopted the folk legend's surname. Jones changed his last name in the 1960s because he feared confusion with Davy Jones, a member of the already famous The Monkees. He chose the Bowie eponym because he admired James Bowie and the Bowie knife, although his pronunciation uses the BOH-ee (/ˈboʊi/) variant.

Bowie County in northeast Texas, and the city of Bowie in Montague County, Texas, were both named in honor of James Bowie. James Bowie Elementary in Corsicana, Texas and James Bowie Middle School in Odessa, Texas were also named in his honor.

=== Monuments ===
- Alamo Cenotaph, San Antonio, sculptor Pompeo Coppini, east panel of the Cenotaph features a Bowie statue and a statue of James Bonham in front of other Alamo defenders
- James Bowie Statue, Statues of Heroes at The Alamo, by Deborah Fellows

== See also ==
- Bibliography of the Texas Revolution, Republic, and Annexation
