= Rezin Bowie =

American politician (1793–1841)

Rezin Pleasant Bowie
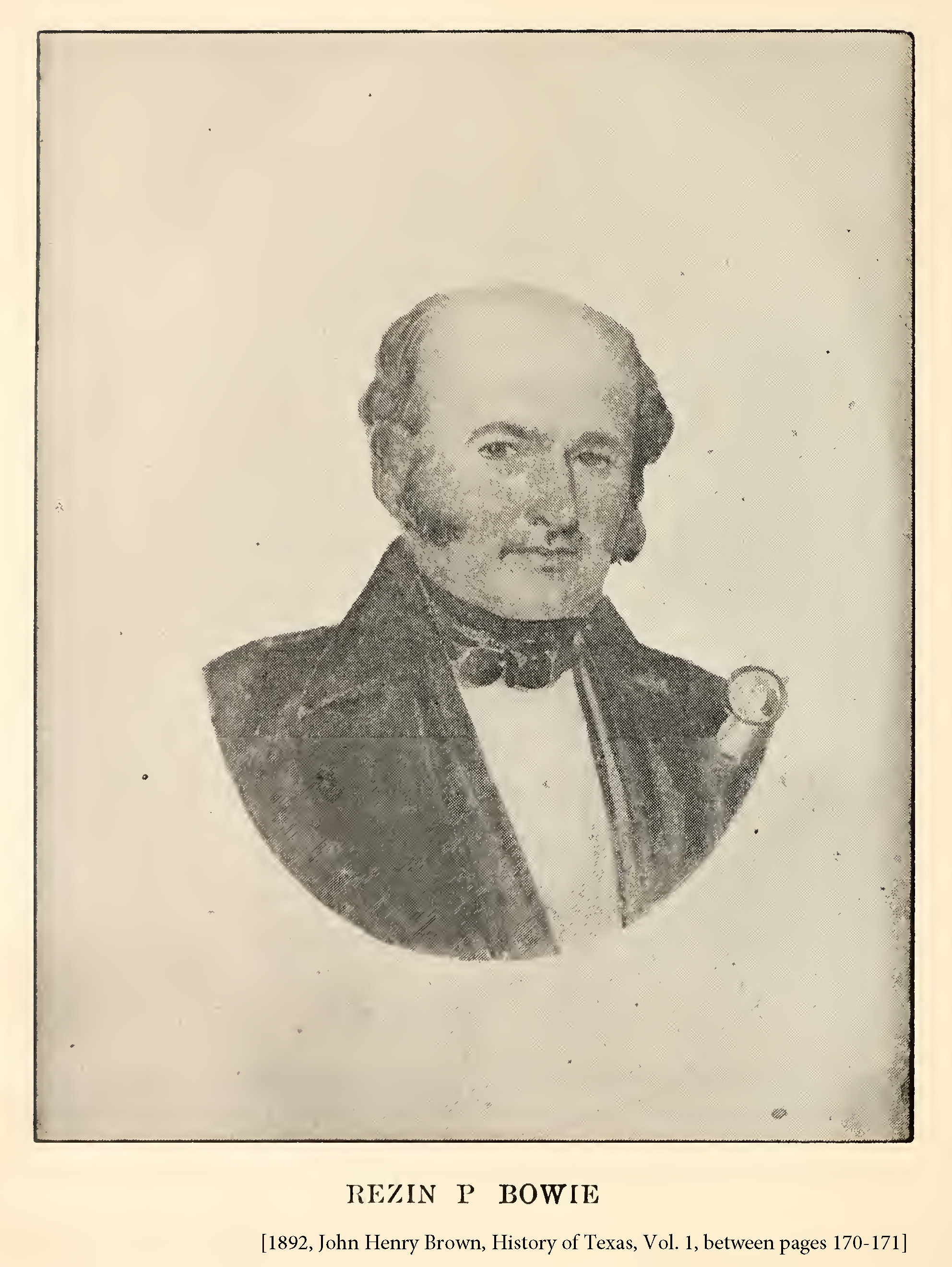
- Born: September 9, 1793; Sumner County, Southwest Territory, US
- Died: January 17, 1841 (aged 47); New Orleans, Louisiana, US
- Occupations: Adventurer (treasure hunter, smuggler, slave trader, land speculator), soldier, inventor, cattleman, sugar planter, legislator

Rezin Pleasant Bowie (/ˈbuːi/ BOO-ee) (Note: Bowie's surname was pronounced /ˈbuːi/ BOO-ee. Some reference works, however, refer to an incorrect alternate pronunciation /ˈboʊi/ BOH-ee.) (September 8, 1793 – January 17, 1841) was an American planter, inventor, and mercenary. He also served three terms in the Louisiana House of Representatives.

With his brother James "Jim" Bowie, Rezin Bowie smuggled slaves and worked as a land speculator. The brothers set up the first steam-powered sugar mill in Louisiana. Bowie took credit for inventing the Bowie knife, which came to prominence when used by James in the Sandbar Fight of 1827.

After James moved to Mexican Texas, Rezin accompanied him on an expedition to find the Lost San Saba Mine. They did not find the mine, but their adventures in fending off a much larger Indian raiding party became widely known.

In his later years Bowie suffered from poor eyesight. He lived with his wife and daughters on a plantation in Louisiana.

== Early years ==
Rezin Bowie was born September 8, 1793, near what is now Gallatin, Tennessee, in Sumner County, Southwest Territory. one of ten children born to Rezin Bowie and Elve Ap-Catesby Jones. Bowie was one of twins, with brother Rhesa. His father had been injured while fighting in the American Revolution, and, in 1782, married the young woman who had nursed him back to health. Elve was probably related to Thomas ap Catesby Jones (1790-1858), who was the naval commander at the 1814 Battle of Lake Borgne in Louisiana. Bowie's surname was pronounced /ˈbuːi/ BOO-ee (although some reference works refer to an incorrect alternate pronunciation /ˈboʊi/ BOH-ee).

The Bowies moved repeatedly, first settling in Georgia, where they had six children, and then moving to the Southwest Territory (if they arrived there before 1790, this area was still part of North Carolina) in the future state of Tennessee. The year after Bowie's birth, the family moved to Logan County in the brand-new state of Kentucky. By 1796, his father owned 8 slaves, 7 horses, 11 head of cattle, and 1 stud horse. The following year the family acquired 200 acres (80 ha) along the Red River. In 1800, Rezin Bowie sold his property and the family spent two years in what would become Missouri many years later. At this time it was part of Upper Louisiana or what the Spanish colonial authorities called the District of Illinois.

The Bowie family moved to Lower Louisiana in 1802, settling on the Bushley Bayou in Rapides Parish. The Bowie family moved again in 1809, settling on Bayou Teche in the now-American Territory of Orleans, before finding a permanent home in Opelousas, in St. Landry Parish, in 1812. That year, the Territory of Orleans became the U.S. state of Louisiana. By this time, Rezin was about 19 years old.

Each of their homes had been on the frontier, and even as a small child Bowie was expected to help clear the land and plant crops. He and his siblings were educated at home, and they learned to read and write in English. With his younger brother James, Rezin learned to speak, read, and write Spanish and French fluently. The children were also taught how to survive on the frontier, as well as how to fish and run a farm and plantation.

Bowie converted to Roman Catholicism in 1814 and married Margaret Nevil in St. Landry Catholic Church in Opelousas on September 15, 1814. Later that year he and James enlisted in the Louisiana militia in response to Andrew Jackson's plea for volunteers to fight the British. The War of 1812 ended early in 1815, and the Bowie brothers arrived in New Orleans too late to participate in the fighting. Bowie later joined the Avoyelles Battalion and was commissioned a captain of the Mounted Rifles in 1825, later becoming a colonel.

== Land speculator ==
Shortly before Bowie's father died in 1818 or 1819, he gave Bowie and his brother James each 10 slaves, horses, and cattle. For the next seven years the brothers worked together to develop several large estates in Lafourche Parish and Opelousas Parish. Louisiana was gaining population rapidly, and the brothers wished to take advantage of rising land prices by speculating in land, but did not have the capital required to buy large tracts. To raise money they entered into partnership with pirate Jean Lafitte in 1818. The United States had previously outlawed the importation of slaves; and, to encourage citizens to report the unlawful activity, most Southern states allowed anyone who informed on a slave trader to receive half of what the imported slaves would earn at auction.

They made three trips to Lafitte's compound on Galveston Island, where they bought smuggled slaves at $1 per pound. They then brought the captives to Louisiana, where they delivered them to the customs house officer. The officer then offered the enslaved up at auction, where the Bowies could buy the enslaved legally. Under the Louisiana laws, the brothers received half of the price paid. They could then legally transport the slaves and resell them in New Orleans or areas further up the Mississippi River. The brothers continued this scheme until they had collected $65,000, then began speculating in land.

In 1825, the two brothers joined with their younger brother Stephen to buy Acadia, a plantation near Thibodaux. Within two years they had set up the first steam-powered sugar mill in Louisiana to be used for grinding sugar cane. The plantation became known as a "model estate," but on February 12, 1831, they sold it and 65 slaves for $90,000. With their profits, Bowie and James bought a plantation in Arkansas, which joined the Union in 1836. In this time period Bowie served in the Louisiana legislature three times.

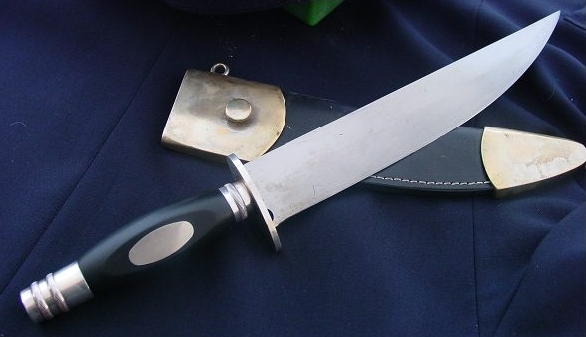
An early Bowie of the type made for Rezin Bowie and commissioned by the Bowies to Searles and Constable. This is a copy of the Fowler Bowie currently displayed at the Alamo.

== Bowie knife ==
One afternoon Rezin was hunting and killed a rabbit. He was going to skin his rabbit when he hit a bone, his hand slid down and badly cut his fingers. Inspired to prevent a reoccurrence, he subsequently designed what became known as the Bowie knife. This knife had a blade nine and a quarter inches long and one and one-half inches wide.

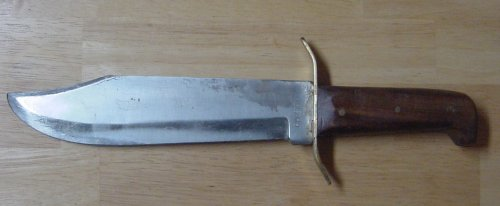
A Bowie knife

The following year, on September 19, 1827, James Bowie and Major Norris Wright attended a duel on a sandbar outside of Natchez, Mississippi, supporting opposing sides. The duel was resolved with a handshake, but other members of the groups, who had various reasons for disliking each other, began fighting. James Bowie suffered several serious injuries, and was repeatedly shot and stabbed, but managed to pull his knife and use it to disembowel Wright, who died instantly.

Newspapers picked up the story, which became known as the Sandbar Fight, and Bowie's fighting prowess and his knife were described in detail. There is disagreement among scholars as to whether the knife used in this fight was the same kind of knife now known as a Bowie knife. Many different accounts exist of who designed and built the first Bowie knife. Some claim that James Bowie designed it and others attribute the design to noted knifemakers of the time. However, in a letter to The Planter's Advocate, Bowie claimed to have invented the knife, and many Bowie family members and "most authorities on the Bowie knife tend to believe it was invented by" Bowie. His grandchildren, however, claimed that Bowie merely supervised his blacksmith who created the knife.

After the Sandbar Fight, and subsequent battles in which James Bowie successfully used his knife, it became very popular. Many craftsman and manufacturers made their own versions of the knife, and many major cities of the Southwest had "Bowie knife schools", which taught "the art of cut, thrust, and parry." His fame, and that of his knife, spread to Britain, and by the early 1830s many British knife manufacturers were producing Bowie knives, shipping many of them to the United States for sale. The design of the knife continued to evolve, and it is generally agreed to have a blade 8.25 inches long and 1.25 inches wide, with a curved point. It had a "sharp false edge cut from both sides" and a cross-guard to protect the user's hands.

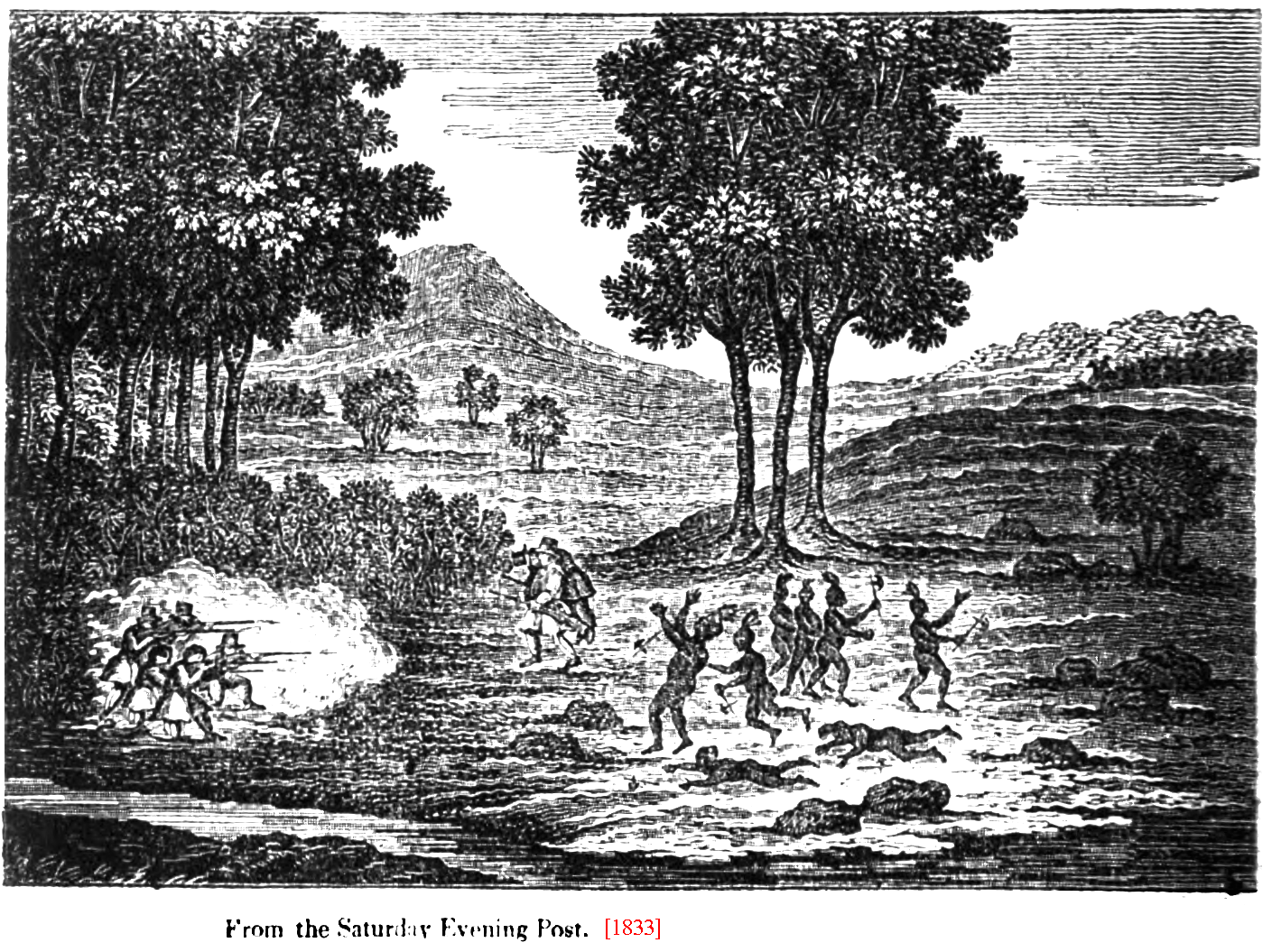
Woodcut illustrating Rezin Bowie's 1833 account of an 1831 Indian fight in Texas appearing in the Saturday Evening Post and Atkinson's Casket

== Lost San Saba Mine ==
James Bowie's 1831 report of Indian fight near San Saba from Brown's History of Texas (1892)

James Bowie moved to Texas in 1830 and became fascinated with the story of the "lost" Los Almagres Mine, said to be west of San Antonio near the ruin of Mission Santa Cruz de San Sabá. The mine had been operated by the local Indians before being seized by the Spanish. After Mexico won independence from Spain, government interest in the mines waned. A number of hostile Indian tribes roamed the area, including Comanche, Lipan Apache, and Karankawa, and without government troops to keep the tribes at bay, mining ceased. It was believed that after the Mexican citizens left the area, the Lipan Apaches took over the mines.

On November 2, 1831, Bowie accompanied his brother and nine others on a search for San Saba. Six miles (ten kilometers) from their goal the group realized that they were being followed by a large Indian raiding party and stopped to negotiate. The attempts at parley failed, and Bowie and his group were forced to fight for their lives for the next thirteen hours. When the Indians finally retreated Bowie had reportedly lost only one man, while over forty Indians had been killed and thirty more wounded.

In 1832, Bowie began having trouble with his vision. Accompanied by his brother James, he travelled to New York City, Philadelphia, and Washington, D.C. to seek medical treatment. While in Philadelphia, the publisher of the Saturday Evening Post persuaded Bowie to write an account of the San Saba fight, which was reprinted in 1833 in the book Atkinson's Casket or Gems of Literature, Wit and Sentiment.

== Later years ==
Rezin Bowie's account of an Indian fight in Texas in 1831 [with 1833 woodcut illustration].

After returning home, Bowie and his family moved to a plantation in Iberville Parish. While there, Bowie, along with General John Wilson, acquired the papers of Captain Vicente Sebastian Pintado, the royal surveyor for the Spanish government. Pintado had kept his surveys and his records of deeds and grants in Louisiana (New Spain) as his personal property, and he refused to sell them to the United States.

After Pintado's death, his widow sold the papers to Bowie and Wilson for $24,500 (the United States declined to pay the high price). Bowie wanted the papers to help him in his land speculation dealings, but it is unknown whether he derived any benefit from them.

== Death ==
Rezin Bowie died in New Orleans on January 17, 1841, leaving his wife and three daughters. He was originally buried in the San Gabriel Catholic Church cemetery, but in the 1850s his body was disinterred and reburied at St. Joseph Catholic Cemetery in Port Gibson, Mississippi, the home of his daughter Elve.
