= Bowie knife =

Pattern of fixed-blade fighting knife

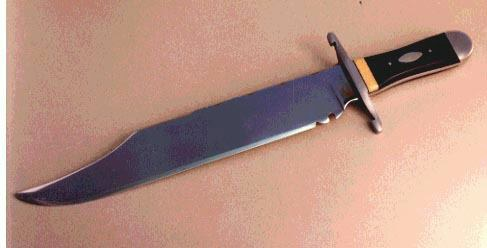
- "Bowie knife"
- Type: Fighting knife
- Place of origin: Arkansas, U.S.

Production history
- Designer: Rezin Bowie
- Designed: 1830
- Produced: 1830–present

Specifications
- Length: 12–18 inches (30–46 cm)
- Blade length: 5–12 inches (13–30 cm)
- Blade type: Clip-point

A Bowie knife (/ˈbuːi/ BOO-ee) (Note: Bowie's surname was pronounced /ˈbuːi/ BOO-ee. Some reference works, however, document an alternate pronunciation /ˈboʊi/ BOH-ee.) is a pattern of fixed-blade fighting knives created by Rezin Bowie in the early 19th century for his brother James Bowie, who had become famous for his use of a large knife at a duel known as the Sandbar Fight.

Since its first incarnation, the Bowie knife has incorporated several recognizable and characteristic design features. However, in common usage, the term refers to any large sheath knife with a crossguard and a clip point, although there are exceptions and special cases. The knife pattern is still popular with collectors; in addition to various knife manufacturing companies, hundreds of custom knifemakers produce Bowie knives with different types of steel and variations in style.

Damascus steel in a very modern Bowie knife design

== Historical complications ==
Murky definitions, limited supporting documentation, and conflicting claims complicate the early history of the Bowie knife. The Bowie knife is not well defined. By the mid-20th century, most included some blade length and shape combination. In the mid-19th century, when the knife's popularity peaked, the term was applied to a wide range of blades. Absent a consensus definition, clearly defining the knife's origin is impossible. To complicate matters, some American blades that meet the modern definition of the Bowie knife may pre-date Bowie.

The Bowie knife derives part of its name and reputation from James Bowie, a notorious knife fighter who died at the Battle of the Alamo. James Bowie left a very scant paper trail; without verifiable facts, his history was buried in unverifiable knife-fighting legend. Historians seriously entertain the possibility that Bowie fought only one personal knife fight (and, if Rezin Bowie's account is accurate, that fight was not fought with a blade meeting the modern definition). That Sandbar Fight received national publicity (accounts in Philadelphia, New York, and the Niles' Register of Washington, D.C.) within months of the event. James Bowie prominently wore a large knife after the Sandbar fight.

The Bowie family provided a variety of conflicting knife histories. James Bowie left nothing. His brother Rezin Bowie provided a terse history two years after James' death. Sixteen years after James' death, someone (assumed to be James' brother John) slightly amended Rezin's explanation to include a blacksmith. Rezin's grandchildren named a different blacksmith. A later Bowie claimed that the information attributed to John was a lie and that John probably never saw the document, etc.

In the mid-20th century, a Bowie knife book author took liberties with the historical facts. Some documents were misquoted, some reported facts cannot be confirmed, etc. Others incorporated the errors into their accounts of both Bowie and his knives.

With no solid definition and conflicting accounts of knife history, many were credited with the invention or improvement of the blade.

== Origin and description ==
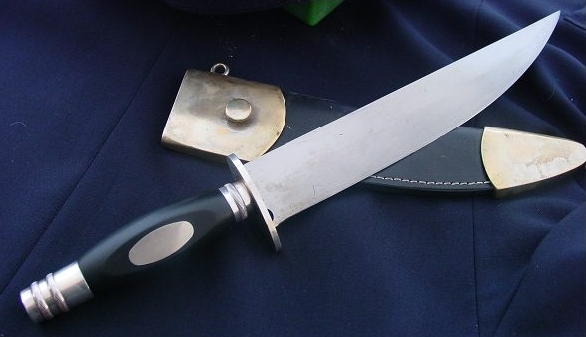
An early Bowie of the type made for Rezin Bowie and commissioned by the Bowies to Searles and Constable. This is a copy of the Fowler Bowie currently displayed at the Alamo.

The historical Bowie knife was not a single design but was a series of knives improved several times by Jim Bowie over the years. The earliest such knife, made by Jesse Clift at Bowie's brother Rezin's request, resembled Spanish hunting knives of the day, and differed little from a common butcher knife. The blade, as later described by Rezin Bowie, was 9 1/2 in (24 cm) long, 1/4 in (6.4 mm) thick and 1 1/2 in (3.8 cm) wide. It was straight-backed, described by witnesses as "a large butcher knife", and having no clip-point nor any handguard, with a simple riveted wood scale handle.

Bernard Levine has reported that the first known Bowie knife showed a strong Mediterranean influence insofar as general lines were concerned, particularly the shape of the traditional Spanish folding knife (navaja), then often carried by immigrants to Mexico and other territories of the Old Southwest. In an 1828 account of the capture of a pirate schooner carrying a mixed group of Spanish and South American pirates, the carrying of knives similar to the early Bowie knife is mentioned:

Amongst these [weapons], were a large number of long knives – weapons which the Spaniards use very dexterously. They are about the size of a common English carving knife, but for several inches up the blade cut both sides.

After the Vidalia Sandbar fight, Bowie was a famous man, and the Bowie brothers received many requests for knives of the same design. Bowie and his brothers later commissioned more ornate custom blades from various knife makers including Daniel Searles and John Constable. George William Featherstonhaugh described them as, "These formidable instruments ... are the pride of an Arkansas blood, and got their name of Bowie knives from a conspicuous person of this fiery climate."

According to an 1847 article, the Bowie knife was initially designed to fill the need for a wearable, convenient, close-combat weapon – a short sword much shorter than the saber or other swords of the day, yet still possessing a heavy blade. This cleaver-like blade had enough weight to give the blade sufficient force in a slashing attack while permitting cut-and-thrust sword fighting tactics. By this time the 'Bowie knife' was already being made in a variety of sizes, with the optimum blade length similar to "that of a carving knife". The blade design was described as:

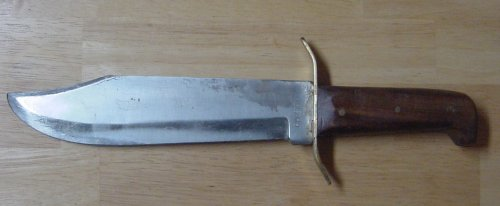
Kennedy notes that Bowie's knife had a blade 9 1/4 inches (23 cm) long and 1 1/2 inches (3.8 cm) wide with a crossguard to protect the user's hands.

Back (spine) perfectly straight in the first instance, but greatly rounded at the end on the edge side; the upper edge at the end, for a length of about two inches [5 cm], is ground into the small segment of a circle and rendered sharp ... The back itself gradually increases in weight of metal as it approaches the hilt, on which a small guard is placed. The Bowie knife, therefore, has a curved, keen point; is double-edged for the space of about two inches [5 cm] of its length, and when in use, falls with the weight of a bill hook.

Most later versions of the Bowie knife had a blade of at least 8 inches (20 cm) in length, some reaching 12 inches (30 cm) or more, with a relatively broad blade that was one and a half to two inches (3.8 to 5.1 cm) wide and made of steel usually between 3/16 to 1/4 in (4.8 to 6.4 mm) thick. The back of the blade sometimes had a strip of soft metal (normally brass or copper) inlaid, which some believe was intended to catch an opponent's blade. In contrast, others hold that it was intended to provide support and absorb shock to help prevent the breaking of poor quality steel or poorly heat-treated blades. (A brass back is an indication of modern construction.) Bowie knives often had an upper guard that bent forward at an angle (an S-guard) intended to catch an opponent's blade or provide protection to the owner's hand during parries and corps-a-corps.

Some Bowie knives had a notch on the bottom of the blade near the hilt known as a "Spanish Notch". The Spanish Notch is often cited as a mechanism for catching an opponent's blade; however, some Bowie researchers hold that the Spanish Notch is ill-suited to this function and frequently fails to achieve the desired results. These researchers, instead, hold that the Spanish Notch has the much more mundane function as a tool for stripping sinew and repairing rope and nets, as a guide to assist in sharpening the blade (assuring that the sharpening process starts at a specific point and not further up the edge), or as a point to relieve stress on the blade during use.

One characteristic of Bowie knives is the clip point at the top of the blade, which brings the blade tip lower than the spine and in line with the handle for better control during thrusting attacks. As the goal is to produce a sharp, stabbing point, most Bowie knives have a bevel ground along the clip, typically 1/4 of the way, but sometimes much further, running the entire top-edge. This is referred to as a false edge, as from a distance it looks sharpened, although it may or may not be. Regardless of whether or not the false edge is sharp, it takes metal away from the point, streamlining the tip and thus enhancing the penetration capability of the blade during a stab. The version attributed to blacksmith James Black had this false edge fully sharpened to allow someone trained in European techniques of saber fencing to execute the maneuver called the "back cut" or "back slash". A brass quillon, usually cast in a mold, was attached to protect the hand.

The Bowie knife's design also lends itself to use as a hunting knife for skinning or butchering game. When suitably sharpened, the curved top clip bevel of the blade may be used to remove the skin from a carcass, while the straight portion of the blade edge, toward the guard, can be used for cutting meat. Arkansas culturalist and researcher Russell T. Johnson describes the James Black knife in the following manner and at the same time captures the quintessence of the Bowie Knife: "It must be long enough to use as a sword, sharp enough to use as a razor, wide enough to use as a paddle, and heavy enough to use as a hatchet." Most such knives intended for hunting are only sharpened on one edge, to reduce the danger of cutting oneself while butchering and skinning the carcass.

== History ==
=== The Vidalia Sandbar Fight ===
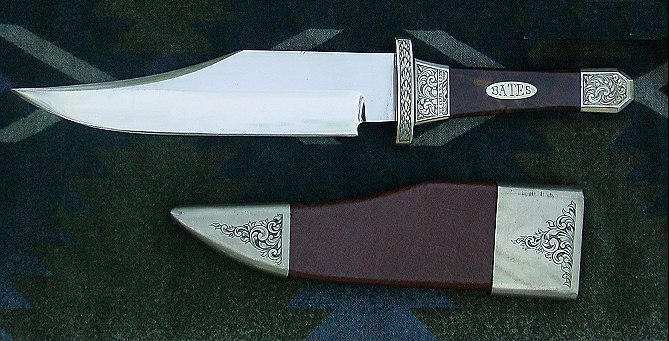
A coffin-handled Bowie knife

The first knife, with which Bowie became famous, allegedly was designed by Jim Bowie's brother Rezin in Avoyelles Parish, Louisiana, and smithed by blacksmith Jesse Clifft out of an old file. Period court documents indicate that Rezin Bowie and Clifft were well acquainted with one another. Rezin's granddaughter claimed in an 1885 letter to Louisiana State University that her mother (Rezin's daughter) personally witnessed Clifft make the knife for her father.

This knife became famous as the knife used by Bowie at the Sandbar Fight, a famous 1827 duel between Bowie and several men including a Major Norris Wright of Alexandria, Louisiana. The fight took place on a sandbar in the Mississippi River across from Natchez, Mississippi, and is the only documented fight in which Bowie was known to have employed his Bowie knife design. In this battle, Bowie was stabbed, shot, and beaten half to death, but managed to win the fight using the large knife.

Jim Bowie's older brother John later claimed that the knife at the Sandbar Fight was not Clifft's knife, but a knife specifically made for Bowie by a blacksmith named Snowden.

=== James Black's Bowie knife ===
The most famous version of the Bowie knife was designed by Jim Bowie and presented to Arkansas blacksmith James Black in the form of a carved wooden model in December 1830. Black produced the knife ordered by Bowie, and simultaneously created another based on Bowie's original design but with a sharpened edge on the curved top edge of the blade. Black offered Bowie his choice, and he chose the modified version. Knives such as this, with a blade shaped like that of the Bowie knife, but with a pronounced false edge, are today called "Sheffield Bowie" knives, because this blade shape became so popular that cutlery factories in Sheffield, England were mass-producing such knives for export to the U.S. by 1850, usually with a handle made from either hardwood, deer antler, or bone, and sometimes with a guard and other fittings of sterling silver. The James Black Bowie knife had a blade approximately twelve inches (30 cm) long, two inches (5.1 cm) wide, and 1/4 inch (0.64 cm) thick. The spine of the knife was covered with soft brass or silver, reportedly to catch the opponent's blade in the course of a knife fight, while a brass quillion protected the hand from the blade.

In 1831, Bowie returned with his James Black Bowie knife to Texas and was involved in a knife fight with three men armed with firearms, who had been hired to kill him by the man he had spared in his 1829 fight. According to reports of the time, Bowie used his knife to kill all three men: one assassin was nearly decapitated, the second was disemboweled, and the skull of the third man was split open. (Note: The details of this account are the result of a 20th century dramatization by an influential writer. It was originally reported that "Bowie became entangled in a difficulty with three desperados who assaulted him with knives. He killed them all with the knife Black had made." The dramatic enhancement (a prior duel, assassins with guns, details of deaths) infected later knife history and Bowie biography. Historians have not located a contemporary report of the fight with three desperados.) Bowie died at the Battle of the Alamo five years later, and in death, both he and his knife became an American legend. The fate of the original Bowie knife is unknown; however, a knife bearing the engraving "Bowie No.1" has been acquired by the Historic Arkansas Museum from a Texas collector and has been attributed to Black through scientific analysis.

Black soon had a booming business making and selling these knives from his shop in Washington, Arkansas. Black continued to refine his technique and improve the quality of the knife as he went. In 1839, shortly after his wife's death, Black was nearly blinded when, while he was in bed with illness, his father-in-law and former partner broke into his home and attacked him with a club, having objected to his daughter having married Black years earlier. Black was no longer able to continue in his trade.

Black's knives were known to be exceedingly tough, yet flexible, and his technique has not been duplicated. Black kept his technique secret and did all of his work behind a leather curtain. Many claim that Black rediscovered the secret of producing true Damascus steel.

In 1870, at the age of 70, Black attempted to pass on his secret to the son of the family that had cared for him in his old age, Daniel Webster Jones. However, Black had retired for many years and had forgotten the secret. Jones would later become the governor of Arkansas.

Historians and knife experts have challenged the claims regarding James Black and his knives. Little can be either proven or disproven; Black was found mentally incompetent before his claims were published.

The birthplace of the Bowie knife is now part of the Old Washington Historic State Park which has over 40 restored historical buildings and other facilities including Black's shop. The park is known as "The Colonial Williamsburg of Arkansas". The University of Arkansas Hope - Texarkana opened its James Black School of Bladesmithing and Historic Trades in historic Washington in January 2020.

=== Later history ===
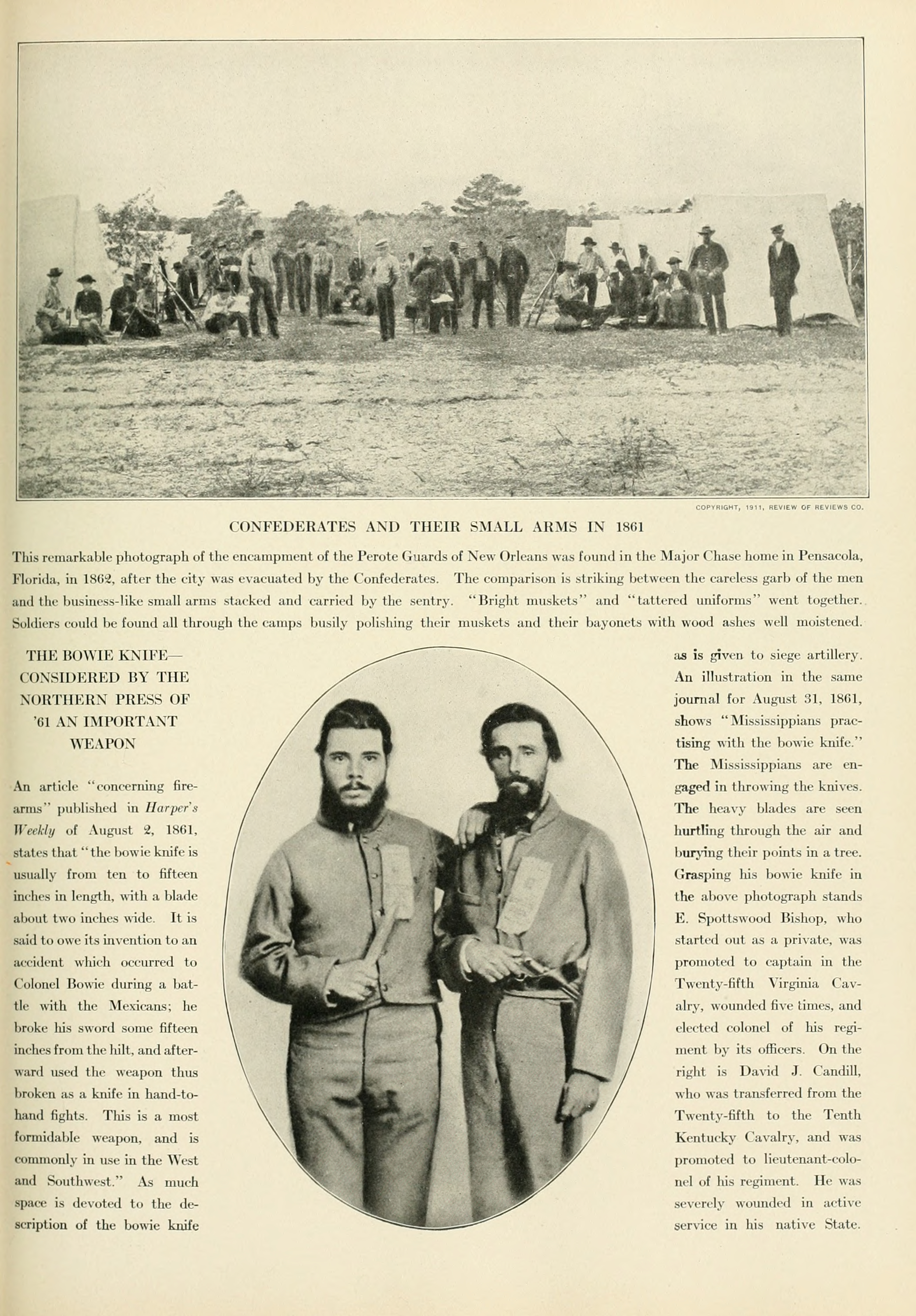
Two members of the 25th Va Cavalry armed with Bowie knives: left Captain E. Spootswood Bishop; right Daniel Caudill served with the 25th Virginia Cavalry and the 10th Kentucky Cavalry

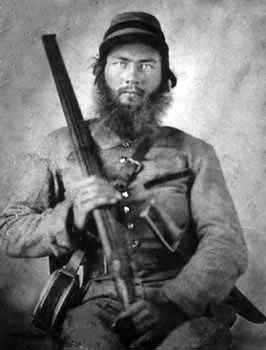
Confederate cavalryman John Duponte of Dartmouth, Alabama with muzzle-loading shotgun and a "Square D" handle Bowie knife

The term "Bowie knife" appeared in advertising (multiple places) by 1835, about 8 years after the sandbar brawl, while James Bowie was still alive. From context, "Bowie knife" needed no description then, but the spelling was variable. Among the first mentions was a plan to combine a Bowie knife and pistol. Cutlers were shipping sheath knives from Sheffield, England, by the early 1830s. By 1838, a writer in a Baltimore newspaper (posted from New Orleans) suggested that every reader had seen a Bowie knife.

The Bowie knife was most popular in the Old Southwest of the mid-19th century. However, accounts of Bowie knife fighting schools are based on fiction; newspapers of the era in the region contained advertisements for classes in fencing and self-defense.

Bowie knives had a role in the American conflicts of the nineteenth century. They are historically mentioned in the independence of Texas, in the Mexican War, the California gold rush, the civil strife in Kansas, the American Civil War, and later conflicts with the American Indians. John Brown (abolitionist) carried a Bowie (which was taken by J. E. B. Stuart). (p 117) John Wilkes Booth (assassin of Abraham Lincoln) dropped a large Bowie knife as he escaped. (p 158) "Buffalo Bill" Cody reportedly scalped a sub-chief in 1876 in revenge for Custer (the Battle of Warbonnet Creek). An illustration of the reputed event showed a Bowie knife. (p 171) Brigham Young, president of the Church of Jesus Christ of Latter-day Saints (LDS Church), used to carry a Bowie knife with him, and dreamed about killing ex-Mormon apostates with it; for this reason, it has a significance to the DezNat (alt-right LDS) community online, who link it to the concept of blood atonement in Mormonism.

Historically, in the US, the heyday of the large Bowie knife was when cap and ball black powder arms were not exceptionally reliable and the single-shot ones slow to load, hence the need for a large knife such as what we call a Bowie as a weapon and for use as a camp knife. When reliable cartridge repeating firearms came along, the size of the blade length and width was reduced because there was less of a need for them as a weapon. With the advent of affordably priced, reliable revolvers in the US (including surplus ex-American Civil War handguns), the popularity of the Bowie knife declined sharply after 1865. While still quite popular, newer Bowie designs began to incorporate much shorter blades of seven or eight inches, a length more suited to butchering and skinning game animals. By the turn of the century, the most mass-produced Bowies were being sold as all-purpose outdoor hunting/camping knives. Despite this, the Bowie still retained its ability to serve as a close-in fighting knife. The USMC Ka-Bar of World War II fame is based on a Bowie design dating back to the classic Marbles Ideal camping/hunting knife first introduced in 1899.

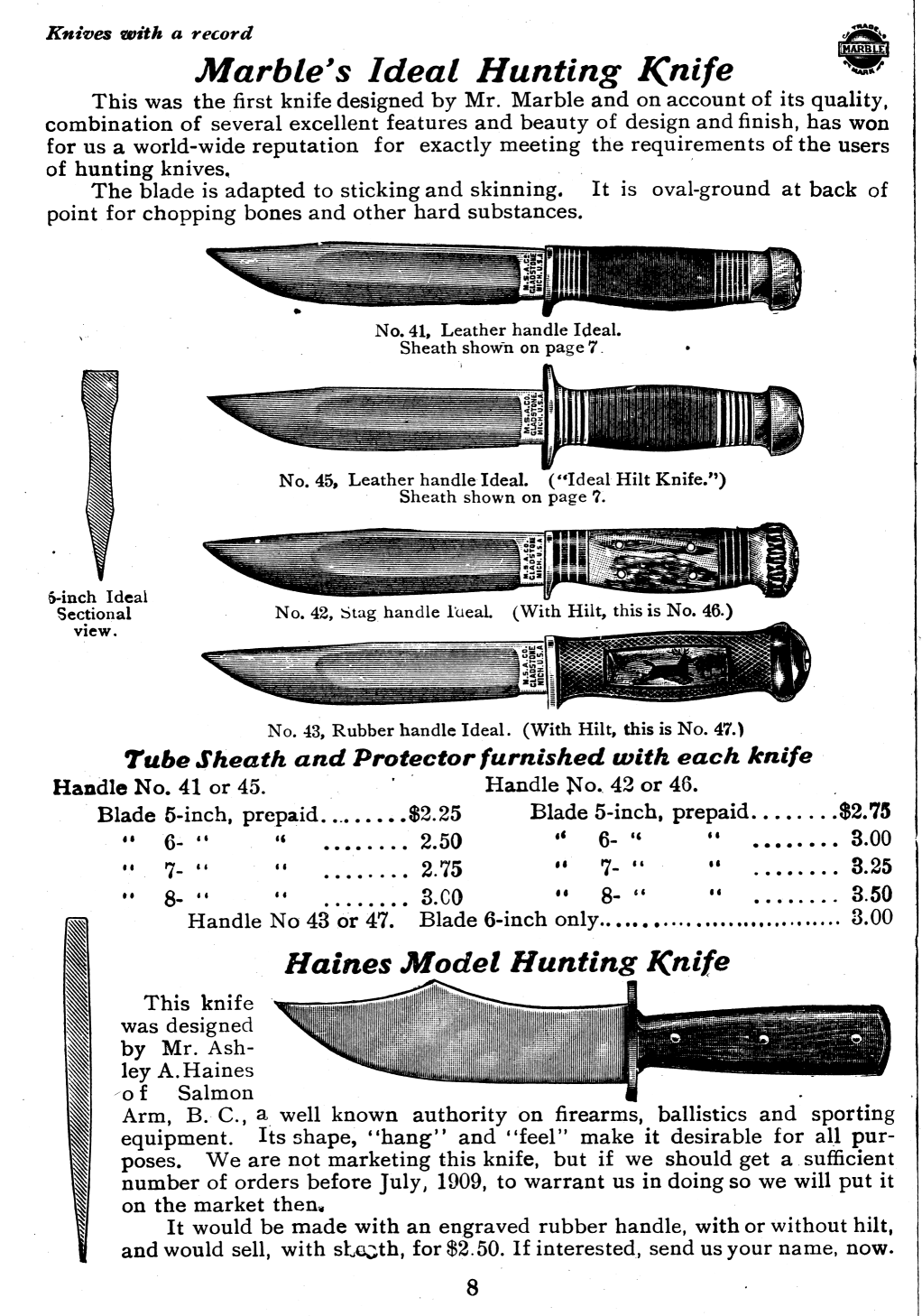
Marbles ad

Since the 1960s, Bowie knives with sawteeth machined into the back side of the blade appeared inspired by the United States Air Force survival knife, which is used by several branches of the US Armed Forces. Each knife is manufactured following US Government specifications. It features a 5" 1095 carbon steel clip point sawback blade with a swedge, false top edge, and fullers. The handle is made from natural leather with a stainless steel butt cap. The natural leather sheath included comes with a whetstone and leg tie. The sawteeth were intended to cut through a downed aircraft's plexiglass canopy. Shortly after, similar knives with a metal hollow handle appeared, allowing small survival items to be stored inside the handle. Bowies are still popular today, evidenced by the plethora of factory-made and custom-made bowie-style knives available to collectors.

== Variations, collecting and portrayal in popular culture ==
Jim Bowie was posthumously inducted into the Blade magazine Cutlery Hall of Fame at the 1988 Blade Show in Atlanta, Georgia in recognition of the impact that his design made upon generations of knife makers and cutlery companies.

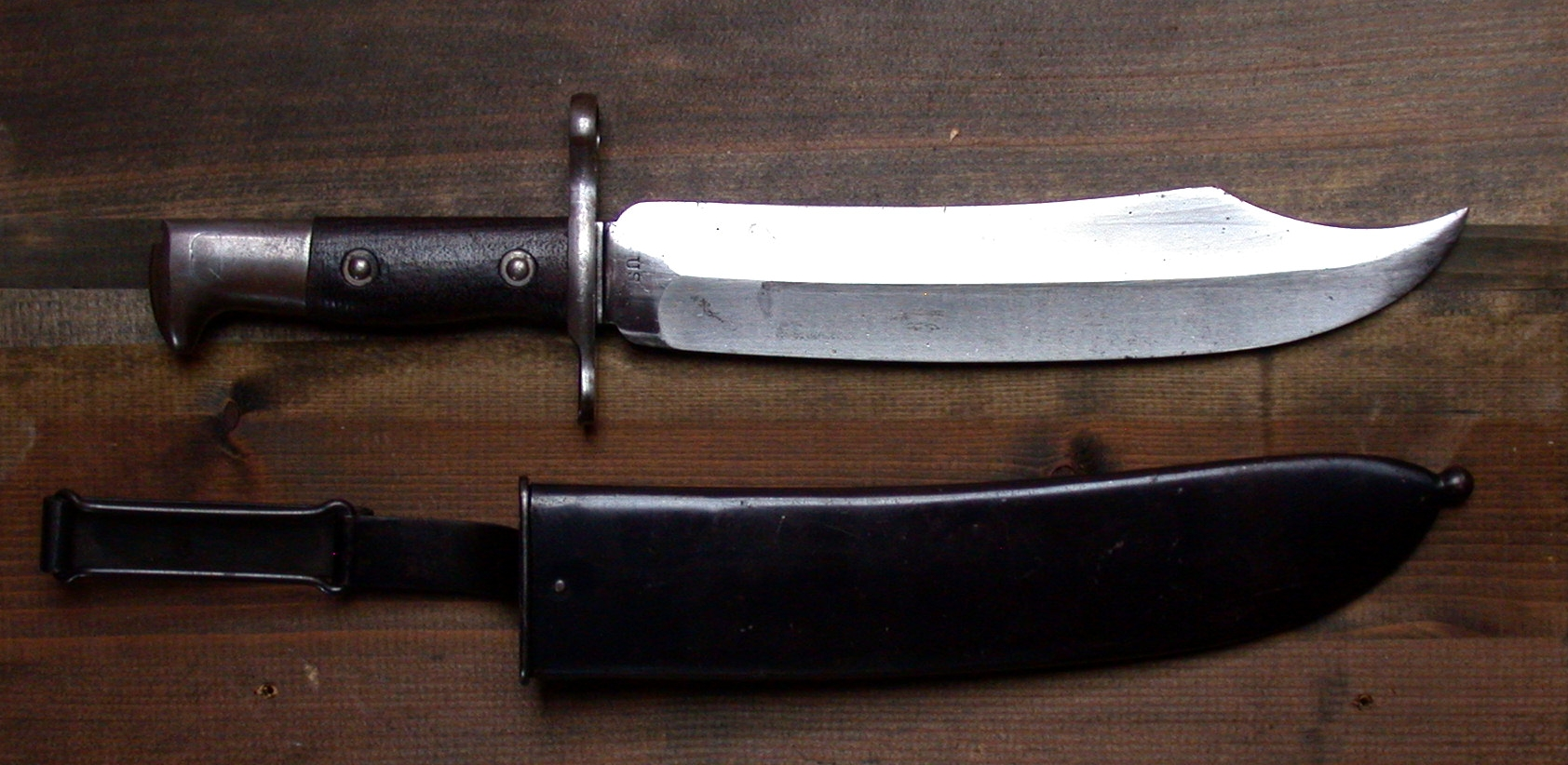
Krag Bowie bayonet US stamped, on the reverse date 1900

Custom knife maker Ernest Emerson originally used a Bowie knife in his logo and manufactures a folding Bowie known in his line-up as the CQC13.

A Bowie knife appears on the shoulder sleeve insignia of the 39th Infantry Brigade Combat Team, headquartered in Little Rock, Arkansas.

=== The Alfred Williams Bowie knife ===
From the mid-1800s to the early 1900s, the Alfred Williams EBRO Bowie knife became a big seller in the US. The EBRO trademark was purchased by Adolph Kastor & Sons of New York from Joseph Wostenholm & Sons in Sheffield. Alfred Williams specialized in selling knives to the US market, and as such, his knives destined for the US market bore the EBRO importer stamp on them along with Alfred Williams' name. Original Alfred Williams Bowie knives now sell for substantial amounts in auctions. One unique Alfred Williams Bowie knife with a carved handle that belonged to a Texan family sold for $60,000 in an auction.

=== Variations ===
Among the many variations on Bowie knives (discussed or shown by Flayderman or Peterson) are Bowies with interchangeable blades, push daggers, double-ended Bowies, folding Bowies, Bowies with a cork screw or other accessories, Bowie bayonets, combination Bowie/pistols, a Bowie with a saw-toothed back and Confederate Bowies with D-guards. Some were works of fine art. A giant folding Bowie, almost 7 feet (2.1 meters) in length and weighing 34 pounds (15 kg) was made for presentation to an American congressman who offered to engage in a knife duel (a dispute between Roger Atkinson Pryor and John F. Potter). A few huge Bowies up to 9 feet (2.7 meters) long were created for exhibition.

Over the years, many knives have been called Bowie knives, and the term has almost become a generic term for any large sheath knife. During the early days of the American Civil War, Confederate soldiers carried immense knives called D-Guard Bowie knives. Many of these knives could have qualified as short swords and were often made from old saw or scythe blades.

The Bowie knife is sometimes confused with the "Arkansas toothpick", possibly due to the interchangeable use of the names "Arkansas toothpick", "Bowie knife", and "Arkansas knife" in the antebellum period. The Arkansas toothpick is essentially a heavy dagger with a straight 15–25 inches (38–64 cm) blade. While balanced and weighted for throwing, the toothpick can be used for thrusting and slashing. Although James Black is popularly credited with inventing the "Arkansas toothpick", no firm evidence exists for this claim.

Knives made in Sheffield, England, were quick to enter the market with "Bowie knives" of a distinctive pattern that most modern users identify with the proper form of a Bowie knife. The Sheffield pattern blade is thinner than the Black/Musso knives, while the false edge is often longer, with a more oblique and less pronounced clip edge. While the Bowie is frequently considered a uniquely American knife, most blades were produced in Sheffield England. Sheffield Bowies were sold with a wide range of etched or stamped slogans designed to appeal to Americans: "Death to Abolition", "Death to Traitors", "Americans Never Surrender", "Alabama Hunting Knife", "Arkansas Toothpick", "Gold Seeker's Protection"... American victories and generals were commemorated. "Bowie Knife" is etched in many different designs (including folding knives) from that era. The British disguised the origin of their products, operating the "Washington", "Philadelphia", "Boston", "Manhattan", "America", and "Columbia Works" in Sheffield. They stamped "US", "NY", etc. on their blades. The Sheffield "factories" were warehouses that collected the work of area craftsmen. The smelters, forgers, grinders, silversmiths, carvers, etchers ... were individuals or small businesses.

=== Collecting ===
During the late 19th and 20th centuries, the Bowie knife served usefully as a camp and hunting tool, as well as a weapon, and is still popular with some hunters and trappers today. However, as today's campers and backpackers generally rely on prepared lightweight foods and have little or no use for a large knife as a weapon or for butchering wild game animals, the traditional Bowie pattern knife is today mostly purchased by collectors or edged weapon enthusiasts.

The Bowie remains popular with collectors. In addition to various knife manufacturing companies, hundreds of custom knife makers and bladesmiths produce Bowies and variations. The Bowie knife dominates the work produced by members of the American Bladesmith Society. Collecting antique Bowie knives is one of the higher-end forms of knife collecting with rare models selling as high as $200,000. Even mass-produced Sheffield Bowies from the 19th century can sell in the range of $5,000US to $15,000US.

=== Portrayal in popular culture ===
The Bowie knife has been present in popular culture throughout the ages, ranging from the days of the Western dime novels and pulps to Literary Fiction such as the 1897 classic vampire novel Dracula by Irish author Bram Stoker. Despite the popular image of Count Dracula having a stake driven through his heart at the conclusion of the story, Dracula is killed by his heart being pierced by Quincey Morris's Bowie knife and his throat being sliced by Jonathan Harker's kukri knife. The character Tarzan is depicted to own a Bowie knife that belonged to his late father. Bowie knives appeared in the classic works of Americans Harriet Beecher Stowe and Mark Twain, Englishman Charles Dickens, and Frenchman Jules Verne.

The Bowie knife is a staple in The Alamo movies of 1960 and 2004; the first three Rambo movies, First Blood (1982), Rambo: First Blood Part II (1985), and Rambo III (1988); the film Crocodile Dundee (1986) and its sequel Crocodile Dundee II (1988); and Friday the 13th (1980). The Bowie knife is also Ghostface's signature weapon in the Scream franchise (1996). In the Quentin Tarantino film Inglourious Basterds, the character Lt. Aldo Raine carries a Bowie knife which he uses to carve swastika symbols on to the foreheads of Nazi soldiers.

The famous singer and musician David Bowie (born David Robert Jones) took the name Bowie after the Bowie knife because, in his words, "it cuts both ways".

== Historical and modern legal status ==
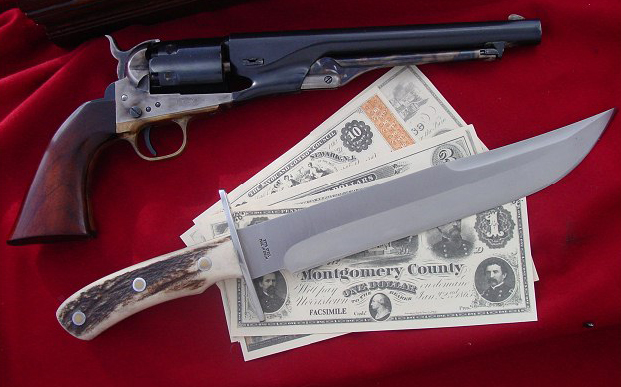
Sheffield pattern blades are not quite as wide as the Black design but most variations carry a false-edged clip point.

Because of its widespread use and deadly effect when used in hand-to-hand fighting, it has been argued by some historians that the Bowie knife was seen by upper-class Americans as the 19th-century equivalent of today's mass-produced handgun or 'Saturday night special', particularly in the states of the Old Southwest. In 1837, just one year after Bowie's death at the Alamo, Alabama legislators passed laws imposing a $100 transfer tax on 'Bowie' knives and decreeing that anyone carrying a Bowie knife who subsequently killed a person in a fight would be charged with premeditated murder. Louisiana and Virginia prohibited the concealed carrying of any Bowie knife, while Mississippi made such knives illegal when carried concealed or when used as a dueling weapon. In Tennessee, the use of Bowie knives to settle disputes on the spot so alarmed the wealthy classes composing the state legislature that in 1838 they not only made the concealed carrying of a Bowie knife a criminal felony, but also prohibited the use of a Bowie knife in any altercation, regardless of self-defense or other mitigating excuse:

That if any person carrying any knife or weapon known as a Bowie knife ... or any knife or weapon that shall in form, shape, or size resemble a Bowie knife, on a sudden encounter, shall cut or stab another person with such knife or weapon, whether death ensues or not, such person so stabbing or cutting shall be guilty of a felony, and upon conviction thereof shall be confined in the jail and penitentiary house of this State, for a period of time not less than three years, nor more than fifteen years.

Even Texas passed legislation in 1871 prohibiting the carrying of a Bowie knife "on or about one's person" in public places. This law remained in place until 2017.

Although many jurisdictions worldwide have knife legislation regulating the length of a blade one may own or carry, certain locales in the United States have legislation restricting or prohibiting the carrying of a "Bowie knife". Most of these laws were characterized at the time as 'anti-dueling' laws. However, in this context, the term dueling had degenerated from its original 18th century definition (a rarely used social custom among the wealthy classes) into a generalized description for any knife or gun fight between two contestants. In some states, many of these laws are still in force today, whereas in others, these laws were repealed or amended.

In 2017, the old Texas law prohibiting the carrying of a Bowie knife in public was finally updated to allow such carry in most circumstances, with exceptions for knives of a certain blade length which cannot be carried in schools, polling places, places of worship, amusement parks, courthouses, racetracks, correctional facilities, hospitals and nursing facilities, sporting events, and certain establishments selling alcohol. The Texas Legislature designated the Bowie knife as the official state knife of Texas in 2021.

It is argued that "Bowie Knife" and "Arkansas Toothpick" are too subjective to form the basis of sound legislation.

== See also ==
- Arkansas toothpick
