= Sandbar Fight =

Deadly brawl in Louisiana, 1827

Drawing of the Sandbar Fight, 1967

The Sandbar Fight, also known as the Vidalia Sandbar Fight, was a formal one-on-one duel that erupted into a violent brawl involving several combatants on September 19, 1827. It occurred on a large Mississippi River sandbar between Vidalia, Louisiana, and Natchez, Mississippi. The fight resulted in the death of General Samuel Cuny and Major Norris Wright. The American pioneer and folk hero James Bowie survived but was seriously injured in the fight.

The site of the brawl was originally a neutral island in the middle of the river, with the river flowing mainly on the west side of the island. The river's main course has since moved to the east side of the island, so the site of the fight is thus located west of the modern river on Giles Island. However, the river's original path still serves as the border between Mississippi and Louisiana, so the brawl site is and always was within Mississippi.

== Background ==
The Sandbar Fight followed conflicts that had occurred in central Louisiana. Members of the wealthy and established Wells and Cuny families, who were close relatives, were engaged in continuous feuds with many of the region's newer families. The subjects of the disputes included competing financial interests, allegations of vote-fixing in a sheriff's election, dishonored notes (bad loans), denied bank loans, and, as rumored, the honor of a woman. Several participants in the brawl had previously engaged in duels, fist fights, and exchanges of gunfire. Two previous attempts at resolving disputes by dueling had ended without resolution, either because they degenerated into shouting matches between seconds or one party failed to appear.

The duel that became the Sandbar Fight was initially arranged over grievances between Samuel L. Wells, III, and Dr. Thomas H. Maddox, both of Alexandria, Louisiana. They agreed to a duel at a neutral site, eventually choosing a wide, sandy shoal in the middle of the Mississippi River because it was considered outside the jurisdiction of local law enforcement, thus less likely to be subject to anti-dueling laws. Wells and Maddox, the primary duelists, were attended by seconds and several friends and supporters. Norris Wright, in particular, was known to be violent. In a previous encounter, Wright shot Bowie; the intervention of observers prevented Bowie from then killing Wright. Afterwards, Bowie carried a sheath knife in preparation for a rematch in the Sandbar Fight.

== Participants and eyewitnesses ==
Wells Partisans	Maddox Partisans	Role	Injuries
Samuel L. Wells III	Dr. Thomas H. Maddox	Duelist	No injuries
Major George McWorter	Colonel Robert A. Crain	Second	Crain lightly injured
Dr. Richard Cuny	Dr. James A. Denny	Surgeon (nonparticipant)	Denny lightly injured
James "Jim" Bowie	Alfred Blanchard	Supporter	Both badly injured
General Samuel Cuny	Carey Blanchard	Supporter	Cuny killed
Thomas Jefferson Wells	Major Norris Wright	Supporter	Wright killed

Dr. Denny was a local surgeon and relatively nonpartisan in the conflict.

Of the 12 listed participants, the duelists and surgeons played minor or pacifist roles during the brawl. The seconds and supporters were all active brawlers; half were killed or badly injured. Also, at least five additional people were local witnesses - two plantation owners, two additional doctors, and a guide. Some unnamed slaves likely witnessed the brawl as well.

== Duel ==
On Wednesday, September 19, 1827, at midday, Wells and Maddox, accompanied by their seconds and supporters, met on a sandbar near the town of Natchez, Mississippi. Jim Bowie supported Wells, while Norris Wright favored Maddox. In total, 17 named men were present. The Wells party arrived first by a small boat from the Louisiana shore. The Maddox party and local observers then arrived by horse from a nearby Mississippi plantation house, fording a bayou. The duel was conducted by formal rules of the time, with a lengthy delay between exchanges of fire. The noncombatant witnesses (including the surgeons) kept a reasonable distance from the duel for the duration of the fight.

Wells and Maddox each fired two shots, and as neither man was injured, they resolved the formal duel with a handshake.

== Brawl ==
After the initial duel, the party of six (Wells, Maddox, McWorter, Crain, Dr. Cuny, and Dr. Denny) prepared to celebrate survival. They walked towards the remaining Maddox partisans because no duel participant had a violent relationship with that group. The duel participants were balanced in number (three each) and unarmed except for their seconds. Crain carried a loaded pistol in each hand. The remaining Wells partisans intercepted the duel participants; Crain now faced three additional armed men. Seeing this from a distance, the remaining Maddox partisans began running forward to join the group. General Cuny, who had previously fought with Crain, is recorded as having called out to him, "Col. Crain, this is a good time to settle our difficulty." Crain fired, missing Cuny but striking Bowie in the hip and knocking him to the ground. Cuny and Crain then exchanged fire, with Crain sustaining a flesh wound in the arm and Cuny dying from a shot to the chest or thigh.

Bowie, rising to his feet, drew his knife and charged at Crain, who struck him so hard upon the head with his empty pistol that it broke and sent Bowie to his knees. Wright appeared, drew a pistol, and shot at the fallen Bowie, missing. Wright then drew his sword cane and stabbed Bowie in the chest, but his sternum deflected the thin blade. As Wright attempted to pull the blade free, Bowie reached up, grabbed his shirt, and pulled him down upon the point of his Bowie knife. Wright died quickly, and Bowie was shot again and stabbed by another member of the group. As Bowie stood, both Blanchard brothers fired at him, and he was struck once in the arm. Bowie spun and cut off part of Alfred's forearm; Carey fired a second shot at Bowie, but missed. As the Blanchard brothers fled, Alfred was shot "through the arm" by Jefferson Wells while Carey was shot at by Major McWorter "without effect."

The brief (90-second) brawl left Samuel Cuny and Norris Wright dead, and Alfred Blanchard and Jim Bowie badly wounded. The unarmed Dr. Denny was shot in the finger and the thigh. Others may have suffered minor injuries; Crain claimed that a bullet "grazed the skin" of his arm.

Crain helped carry Bowie away, with Bowie recorded as having thanked him, saying, "Col. Crain, I do not think, under the circumstances, you ought to have shot me." One doctor reputedly said, "How he [Bowie] lived is a mystery to me, but live he did." The five doctors who had been present for the duel patched Bowie's wounds. The dead and wounded (at least, and perhaps all partisans) promptly crossed the river by boat soon after the death of General Cuny.

== Aftermath ==
Determining the precise order of events that led to the brawl between Wells' and Maddox's supporters is difficult, as the fight was described by at least eight eyewitnesses with significant discrepancies, such as: "Crain and Bowie exchanged fire. Crain missed Bowie, who was later shot in the hip," "Crain deliberately shot Bowie, who remained standing"; and "Crain shot Bowie in the hip, knocking him off his feet".

On September 24, five days after the brawl, Samuel Wells wrote to the press, claiming that Crain's shooting of Cuny constituted premeditated murder. On October 3, Crain wrote in a letter, "Bowie, at the same time, was drawing his pistol. I drew away from him; he says now that I did not touch him but drew his fire. He lies; I shot him through the body as he shot me. I could not miss, shooting not further than ten feet, and the object is to excuse his conduct for killing our poor friend [Major Wright]." Crain was attacking any claim of self-defense that Bowie might mount concerning Wright's death. These and other accounts of the brawl by participants were colored by legal considerations. Samuel L. Wells, III, died within a month of an unrelated fever, so his testimony was not long available to support criminal charges.

Discrepancies also exist in many other accounts, including the number injured, the nature of their wounds, and the precise sequence of events. The brawlers themselves provided few and probably biased accounts, and avoided local law enforcement and the press. Unbiased observers, who provided numerous accounts, could not initially reliably name the participants, many of whom were strangers to them. The eyewitness accounts were also embellished with time.

Regional and national newspapers soon picked up the story, known as the "Sandbar Fight." Bowie's fighting prowess and his knife were described in detail; he had matched or bested multiple opponents after being severely wounded. Most eyewitnesses and a few participants provided accounts to the press (Bowie notably did not). Eyewitness accounts agreed that Bowie did not attack first, and that the others had focused their attack on Bowie because "they considered him the most dangerous man among their opposition." Within a few decades, press accounts departed greatly from the eyewitness versions.

A grand jury was convened in nearby Natchez to determine whether or not criminal charges should be brought. Bowie was never called to testify, and no indictments were returned.

== Legacy ==
Bowie was seriously wounded in the confrontation (according to one account, two bullet wounds, seven stab wounds, and other injuries due to Crain's thrown pistol or alternatively, three bullet and four stab wounds), and took months to recover. He prominently wore a large sheath knife thereafter. Due to the national attention drawn by the Sandbar Fight, Bowie and his knife became well-known throughout the country as icons of a rugged frontier lifestyle. Many craftsmen and manufacturers made their own versions of the 'Bowie knife', beginning with James Black, a blacksmith from Arkansas who designed the original for Bowie in 1830. His fame and that of his knife spread to England, and by the early 1830s, many British knife manufacturers were also producing Bowie knives and exporting them to the United States for sale. By 1835 (while Bowie was still alive), "Bowie knives" were advertised (without further explanation). By 1838, a newspaper writer from New Orleans assumed everyone had seen one. Bowie knives remained popular until at least the 1870s, when large-caliber, reliable pistols became widely available. The knife's design evolved into various blades during the 19th century. By the middle of the 20th century, it was associated with a more specific design - a large sheath knife with a "concave clip point, sharp false edge cut from both sides, and a cross-guard to protect the user's hands".

After the Sandbar Fight, Bowie moved to Texas, married into wealth, searched for a lost silver mine, lost his new family to cholera, and became a leader in the Texas Revolution of 1835–36. He famously perished at the Battle of the Alamo. Bowie was renowned as an early American frontiersman and a legendary knife fighter. However, the only knife fight in which he likely participated was the Sandbar Fight, possibly at The Alamo as well.
