= Arkansas toothpick =

Type of knife or dagger

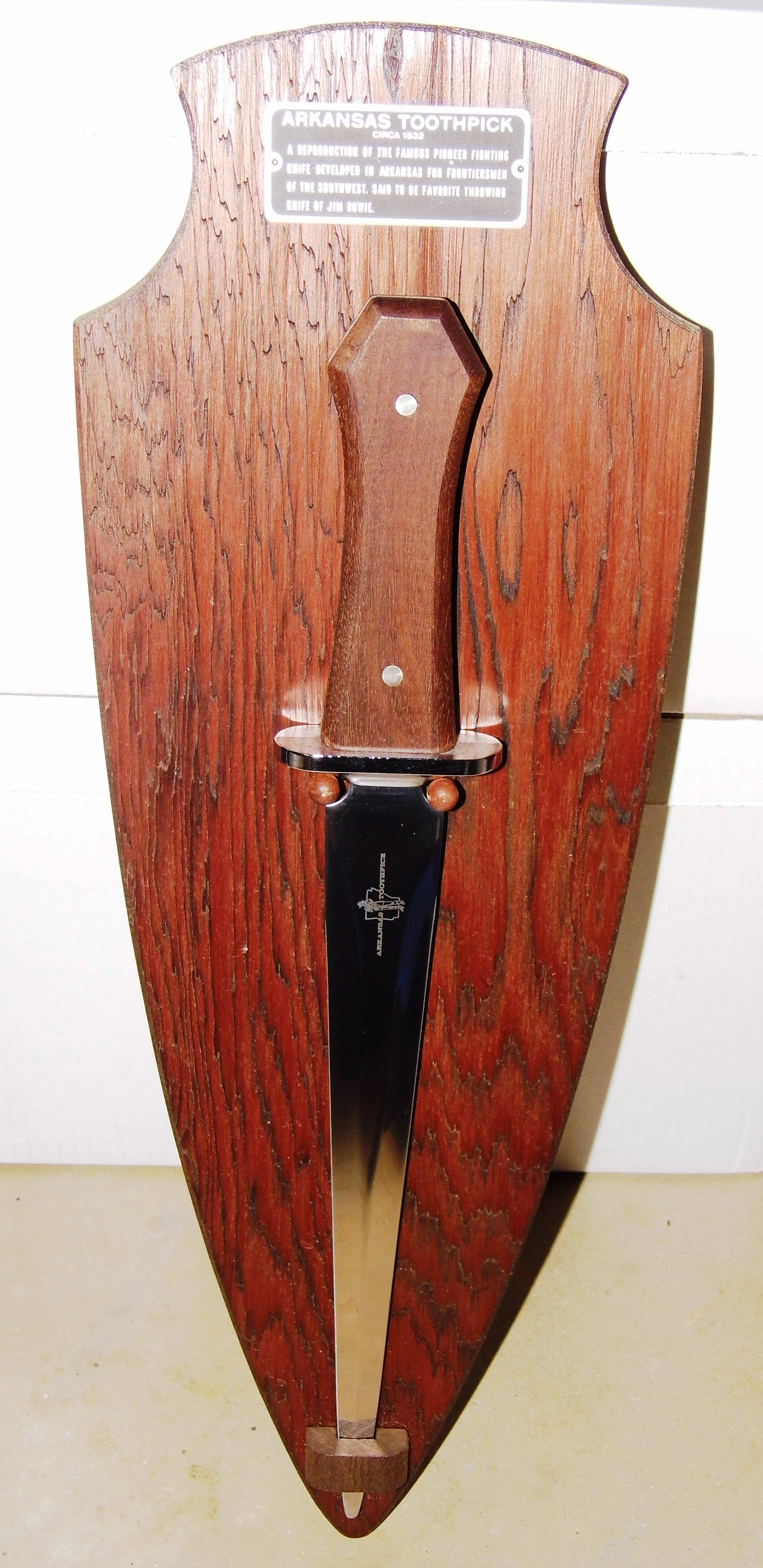
A replica Arkansas Toothpick on display board

In modern terminology, the Arkansas toothpick is a heavy dagger with a 12-to-20-inch (30 to 51 cm) pointed, straight blade. The knife can be used for thrusting and slashing. James Black, known for improving the Bowie knife, is credited with inventing the Arkansas toothpick.

== As against the Bowie Knife ==
There was no consistent distinction made between Bowie knives and Arkansas toothpicks in the mid-19th century. There were enough occasional distinctions to shade any dogmatic statement of equivalence. Americans were observed to use pocket knives to clean their teeth in the era, so the "Arkansas toothpick" term may predate the Bowie knife. There is debatable basis for claiming Arkansas toothpicks were designed for throwing.

== Legal status ==
Although many jurisdictions worldwide have knife legislation regulating the length of a blade or the dagger-like profile of the Arkansas toothpick that can be owned or carried, certain locales in the United States have legislation mentioning the "Arkansas toothpick" in particular. These laws were passed in the late 1830s in Alabama, Tennessee, and Georgia as an attempt to prevent dueling.
