= List of named alloys =

This is a list of named alloys grouped alphabetically by the metal with the highest percentage. Within these headings, the alloys are also grouped alphabetically. Some of the main alloying elements are optionally listed after the alloy names.

== Alloys by base metal ==
=== Alkali intermetallics ===
- Sodium–potassium alloy

=== Aluminum ===
- AA-8000: used for electrical building wire in the U.S. per the National Electrical Code, replacing AA-1350.
- Al–Li (2.45% lithium): aerospace applications, including the Space Shuttle
- Alnico (nickel, cobalt): used for permanent magnets
- Aluminium–Scandium (scandium)
- Birmabright (magnesium, manganese): used in car bodies, mainly used by Land Rover cars.
- Devarda's alloy (45% Al, 50% Cu, 5% Zn): chemical reducing agent.
- Duralumin (copper)
- Hiduminium or R.R. alloys (2% copper, iron, nickel): used in aircraft pistons
- Hydronalium (up to 12% magnesium, 1% manganese): used in shipbuilding, resists seawater corrosion
- Italma (3.5% magnesium, 0.3% manganese): formerly used to make coinage of the Italian lira
- Magnalium (5-50% magnesium): used in airplane bodies, ladders, pyrotechnics, etc.
- Ni-Ti-Al (nickel 50%, titanium 40%, aluminium 10%), also called Nitinol
- Y alloy (4% copper, nickel, magnesium)

Aluminium also forms complex metallic alloys, like β–Al–Mg, ξ'–Al–Pd–Mn, and T–Al_{3}Mn.

=== Beryllium ===
- Lockalloy (62% beryllium, 38% aluminium)

=== Bismuth ===
- Bismanol (manganese); magnetic alloy from the 1950s using powder metallurgy
- Cerrosafe (lead, tin, cadmium)
- Rose metal (lead, tin)
- Wood's metal (lead, tin, cadmium)

=== Chromium ===
- Chromium hydride (hydrogen)
- Nichrome (nickel)
- Ferrochrome (iron)

=== Cobalt ===
- Elgiloy (cobalt, chromium, nickel, iron, molybdenum, manganese, carbon)[Cr-Co-Ni]
- Megallium (cobalt, chromium, molybdenum)
- Stellite (chromium, tungsten, carbon)
- Talonite (tungsten, molybdenum, carbon)
- Ultimet (chromium, nickel, iron, molybdenum, tungsten)
- Vitallium (chromium, molybdenum)

=== Copper ===
- Aluminium bronze (aluminium)
  - Devarda's alloy (aluminium, zinc)
  - Duralumin (aluminium)
  - Nordic gold (aluminium, zinc, tin, nickel)
- Arsenical copper (arsenic)
- Beryllium copper/spring copper (0.5–3% beryllium, 99.5%–97% copper)
- Billon (silver)
  - CuSil (silver)
  - Dymalloy (silver, carbon)
- Brass (zinc) see also Brass §Brass types for longer list
  - Brastil (silicon, zinc, aluminium?)
  - Calamine brass (zinc)
  - Chinese silver (zinc, cobalt, nickel, silver)
  - Dutch metal (zinc)
  - Gilding metal (zinc)
  - Muntz metal (zinc)
  - Pinchbeck (zinc)
  - Pomponne (zinc, tin)
  - Prince's metal (zinc)
  - Tombac (zinc)
- Bronze (tin, or other heavy metals)
  - Arsenical bronze (arsenic, tin)
  - Bell metal (tin)
  - Bismuth bronze (bismuth)
  - Cymbal alloys (tin)
  - Florentine bronze (aluminium or tin)
  - Gunmetal (tin, zinc)
  - Phosphor bronze (tin, phosphorus)
  - Silicon bronze (tin, arsenic, silicon)
  - Speculum metal (tin)
  - White bronze (tin, zinc)
- Colored gold (gold)
  - Auricupride (Cu_{3}Au)
  - Corinthian bronze (gold, silver)
  - Guanín (gold, silver)
  - Hepatizon/black bronze (gold, silver)
  - Red gold (gold)
  - Rose gold (gold, silver)
  - Shakudo (gold)
  - Tumbaga (gold)
- Cupronickel (nickel)
  - Constantan (nickel)
  - Cunife (nickel, iron)
  - Manganin (manganese, nickel)
  - Melchior (nickel); high corrosion resistance, used in marine applications in condenser tubes
  - Nickel silver (nickel, zinc)
  - Tungum (nickel, silicon, aluminium, zinc)
- Copper hydride (hydrogen)
- Copper–tungsten (tungsten)
- Glucydur (beryllium, iron)
- Leaded copper/molybdochalkos (lead)
- Tellurium copper (tellurium)

=== Gallium ===
- AlGa (aluminium, gallium)
- Galfenol (iron)
- Galinstan (indium, tin)

=== Gold ===
See also notes below (Note: The purity of gold alloys is expressed in karats, (UK: carats) which indicates the ratio of the minimum amount of gold (by mass) over 24 parts total. 24 karat gold is fine gold (24/24 parts), and the engineering standard is that it be applied to alloys that have been refined to 99.9% or better purity ("3 nines fine"). There are, however, places in the world that allow the claim of 24kt. to alloys with as little as 99.0% gold ("2 nines fine" or "point nine-nine fine). An alloy which is 14 parts gold to 10 parts alloy is 14 karat gold, 18 parts gold to 6 parts alloy is 18 karat, etc. This is becoming more commonly and more precisely expressed as a decimal fraction, i.e.: 14/24 equals .585 (rounded off), and 18/24 is .750 ("seven-fifty fine"). There are hundreds of possible alloys and mixtures possible, but in general the addition of silver will color gold green, and the addition of copper will color it red. A mix of around 50/50 copper and silver gives the range of yellow gold alloys the public is accustomed to seeing in the marketplace.)

- Colored gold (silver, copper)
- Crown gold (silver, copper)
- Electrum (silver)
- Purple gold (aluminium)
- Goloid
- Rhodite (rhodium)
- Rose gold (copper)
- Tumbaga (copper)
- White gold (nickel, palladium)

=== Indium ===
- Field's metal (bismuth, tin)

=== Iron ===
Most iron alloys are steels, with carbon as a major alloying element.

- Elinvar (nickel, chromium)
- Fernico (nickel, cobalt)
- Ferroalloys (Category:Ferroalloys)
  - Ferroboron
  - Ferrocerium
  - Ferrochrome
  - Ferromagnesium
  - Ferromanganese
  - Ferromolybdenum
  - Ferronickel
  - Ferrophosphorus
  - Ferrosilicon
  - Ferrotitanium
  - Ferrouranium
  - Ferrovanadium
- Invar (nickel)
- Cast iron (carbon)
- Pig iron (carbon)
- Iron hydride (hydrogen)
- Kanthal (20–30% chromium, 4–7.5% aluminium); used in heating elements, including e-cigarettes
- Kovar (nickel, cobalt)
- Spiegeleisen (manganese, carbon, silicon)
- Staballoy (stainless steel) (manganese, chromium, carbon) - see also Uranium below
- Steel (carbon) (Category:Steels)
  - Bulat steel
  - Chromoly (chromium, molybdenum)
  - Crucible steel
  - Damascus steel
  - Ducol
  - Hadfield steel
  - High-speed steel
    - Mushet steel
  - HSLA steel
  - Maraging steel
  - Reynolds 531
  - Silicon steel (silicon)
  - Spring steel
  - Stainless steel (chromium, nickel)
    - AL-6XN
    - Alloy 20
    - Celestrium
    - Marine grade stainless
    - Martensitic stainless steel
    - Alloy 28 or Sanicro 28 (nickel, chromium)
    - Surgical stainless steel (chromium, molybdenum, nickel)
    - Zeron 100 (chromium, nickel, molybdenum)
  - Tool steel (tungsten or manganese)
    - Silver steel (US:Drill rod) (manganese, chromium, silicon)
  - Weathering steel ('Cor-ten') (silicon, manganese, chromium, copper, vanadium, nickel)
  - Wootz steel
  - Wrought iron

=== Lead ===
- Molybdochalkos (copper)
- Solder (tin)
- Terne (tin)
- Type metal (tin, antimony)

=== Magnesium ===
- Elektron
- Magnox (0.8% aluminium, 0.004% beryllium); used in nuclear reactors
- T-Mg–Al–Zn (Bergman phase) is a complex metallic alloy

=== Manganese ===
- MN40, used in a foil for brazing
- MN70, used in a foil for brazing
- Ferromanganese
- Spiegeleisen

=== Mercury ===
- Amalgam
- Ashtadhatu

=== Nickel ===
- Alloy 230
- Alnico (aluminium, cobalt); used in magnets
- Alumel (manganese, aluminium, silicon)
- Brightray (20% chromium, iron, rare earths); originally for hard-facing valve seats
- Chromel (chromium)
- Cupronickel (bronze, copper)
- Ferronickel (iron)
- German silver (copper, zinc)
- Hastelloy (molybdenum, chromium, sometimes tungsten)
- Inconel (chromium, iron)
- Inconel 686 (chromium, molybdenum, tungsten)
- Invar
- Monel metal (copper, iron, manganese)
- Nichrome (chromium)
- Nickel-carbon (carbon)
- Nicrosil (chromium, silicon, magnesium)
- Nimonic (chromium, cobalt, titanium), used in jet engine turbine blades
- Nisil (silicon)
- Nitinol (titanium, shape memory alloy)
- Magnetically "soft" alloys
  - Mu-metal (iron)
  - Permalloy (iron, molybdenum)
  - Supermalloy (molybdenum)
  - Brass (copper, zinc, manganese)
    - Nickel hydride (hydrogen)
    - Stainless steel (chromium, molybdenum, carbon, manganese, sulfur, phosphorus, silicon)
    - Coin silver (nickel)

=== Platinum ===
- Platinum-iridium

=== Plutonium ===
- Plutonium–aluminium
- Plutonium–cerium
- Plutonium–cerium–cobalt
- Plutonium–gallium (gallium)
- Plutonium–gallium–cobalt
- Plutonium–zirconium

=== Rare earths ===
- Mischmetal (various rare earth elements)
- Terfenol-D (terbium, dysprosium, and iron), a highly magnetostrictive alloy used in portable speakers such as the SoundBug device
- Ferrocerium (cerium, iron)
- Neodymium magnets, another strong permanent magnet
- SmCo (cobalt); used for permanent magnets in guitar pickups, headphones, satellite transponders, etc.
- Scandium hydride (hydrogen)
- Lanthanum-nickel alloy (nickel)

=== Rhodium ===
- Pseudo palladium (rhodium–silver alloy)

=== Silver ===
- Argentium sterling silver (copper, germanium)
- Billon
- Britannia silver (copper)
- Doré bullion (gold)
- Dymalloy (copper, metal matrix composite with diamond)
- Electrum (gold)
- Goloid (copper, gold)
- Platinum sterling (platinum)
- Shibuichi (copper)
- Sterling silver (copper)
- Tibetan silver (copper)

=== Titanium ===
- Beta C (vanadium, chromium, others)
- Grade 5 Titanium (aluminium, vanadium) [Ti-6Al-4V]
- Gum metal (niobium, tantalum, zirconium, oxygen); used in spectacle frames, precision screws, etc.
- Titanium carbide (carbon) [Ti-C]
- Titanium gold (gold)
- Titanium hydride (hydrogen)
- Titanium nitride (nitrogen)

=== Tin ===
- Babbitt (copper, antimony, lead; used for bearing surfaces)
- Britannium (copper, antimony)
- Pewter (antimony, copper)
- Queen's metal (antimony, lead, and bismuth)
- Solder (lead, antimony)
- Terne (lead)
- White metal, (copper or lead); used as base metal for plating, in bearings, etc.
- Lead free solder (copper, silver)

=== Tungsten ===
- Carboloy (cobalt)

=== Uranium ===
- Staballoy (depleted uranium with other metals, usually titanium or molybdenum). See also Iron above for Staballoy (stainless steel).
- Uranium hydride (hydrogen)
- Mulberry (alloy) (niobium, zirconium)

=== Zinc ===
- Zamak (aluminium, magnesium, copper)
- Electroplated zinc alloys

== See also ==
- Complex metallic alloys
- Heusler alloy, a range of ferromagnetic alloys (66% copper, cobalt, iron, manganese, nickel or palladium)
- High-entropy alloys
- Intermetallic compounds
- List of brazing alloys
- Pot metal; inexpensive casting metal of non-specific composition
