= Beta C =

Beta C can refer to:

- Beta C-Mag, a NATO-standard magazine for rifles and submachine guns.
- Titanium Beta C, a titanium alloy
