= Ti-6Al-7Nb =

Ti-6Al-7Nb (UNS designation R56700) is an alpha-beta titanium alloy first synthesized in 1977 containing 6% aluminum and 7% niobium. It features high strength and has similar properties as the cytotoxic vanadium containing alloy Ti-6Al-4V. Ti-6Al-7Nb is used as a material for hip prostheses.

Ti―6Al―7Nb is one of the titanium alloys that built of hexagonal α phase (stabilised with aluminium) and regular body-centred phase β (stabilised with niobium). The alloy is characterized by added advantageous mechanical properties, it has higher corrosion resistance and biotolerance in relation to Ti-6Al-4V alloys.

== Physical properties ==
The physical properties of the alloy are mostly dependent on the morphology and the fractions volume of the phases presence from the parameters obtained from the manufacturing process.

Property	Minimum Value	Maximum Value	Unit
Density	4.51	4.53	g/cm^{3}
Hardness	2700	2900	Mpa
Melting point	1800	1860	K
Specific heat	540	560	J/kg*K
Elastic limit	895	905	MPa
Energy content	750	1250	MJ/kg
Latent heat of fusion	360	370	kJ/kg

As shown in the above table, alloying is one effective method to improve mechanical properties, and since Niobium belongs to the same group as Vanadium in the periodic table, it also acts as α β-stabilizing element (similar to Ti-6Al-4V alloy); however, the strength of Nb alloy is little less than that of Ti-6Al-4V .The main difference between Ti-6Al-4V and Ti-6Al-7Nb is related to different factors such as solid-solution strengthening, the structure-refining strengthening provided by the refined two-phase structure, and the difference in the microstructure between the two alloys.

== Production ==
Ti-6Al-7Nb is produced by powder metallurgy methods. The most common methods are hot pressing, metal injection mouldering and blending and pressing. In the production of Ti-6Al-7Nb, usually a sintering temperature between 900 and 1400^{o} C is used. Altering the sintering temperature gives the Ti-6Al-7Nb different properties such as different porosity and microstructure. It also gives a different composition between alpha, beta and alpha+beta phases. In the recent years Ti-6Al-7Nb alloys could also be made by different 3D-printer technique such as SLM and EBM.

== Heat treatment ==
Heat treatment of titanium is demonstrated to have significant influences on reducing the residual stresses, improving the mechanical properties (i.e. tensile strength or fatigue strength by solution treatment and ageing). Moreover, heat treatment provides an ideal combination of ductility, machinability and structural stability due to the differences in microstructure and cooling rates between α and β phases.

The cooling rate have an impact of the morphology. When the cooling rate is reduced for example from air cool to slow cooling, the morphology of the transformed α increases in thickness and length and is contained within fewer, larger α colonies. The α colony size is the most important microstructural properties due to its influences the fatigue properties and deformation mechanics of β processed α+ β alloys.

== Applications ==
- Implant devices replacing such as : failed hard tissue, artificial hip joints, artificial knee joints, bone plates, screws for fracture fixation, cardiac valve prostheses, pacemakers, and artificial hearts.
- Dental application

== Biocompatibility ==
Ti-6Al-7Nb has a high biocompatibility. The oxides from Ti-6Al-7Nb are saturated in the body and are not transported in vivo or are a bioburden. The alloy will not create adverse tissue tolerance reactions and creates fewer giant cell nuclei. Ti-6Al-7Nb also shows a high compatibility to ingrowth to the human body.

== Specification ==
Designations for Ti-6Al-7Nb in other naming conventions include:

- UNS: R56700
- ASTM Standard: F1295
- ISO Standard: ISO 5832-11
