= Wave spring =

A wave spring, also known as coiled wave spring or scrowave spring, is a spring made up of pre-hardened flat wire in a process called on-edge coiling (also known as edge-winding). During this process, waves are added to give it a spring effect. The number of turns and waves can be easily adjusted to accommodate stronger force or meet specific requirements.

== Advantages ==
A wave spring has advantages over a traditional coiled spring or a washer:

- Axial space can be reduced by up to 50%. As a result, the overall size of the assembly becomes smaller, reducing weight and production cost.
- The load in an axial direction is 100% transferable.
- One multi-turn wave spring replaces multiple stacked wave washers. This eases installation and reduces maintenance times.
- A wave spring can accommodate higher thrust load within the axial space as only the wire size, number of waves, wave height and number of turns need to be adjusted to accommodate higher thrust loads.

== Varieties ==
There are several types of wave spring: Single-turn wave springs include gap single-turn and overlap single-turn type. Multi-turn wave spring types, include shim-end and plain-end types. The nested wave spring incorporates smaller waves within larger ones.

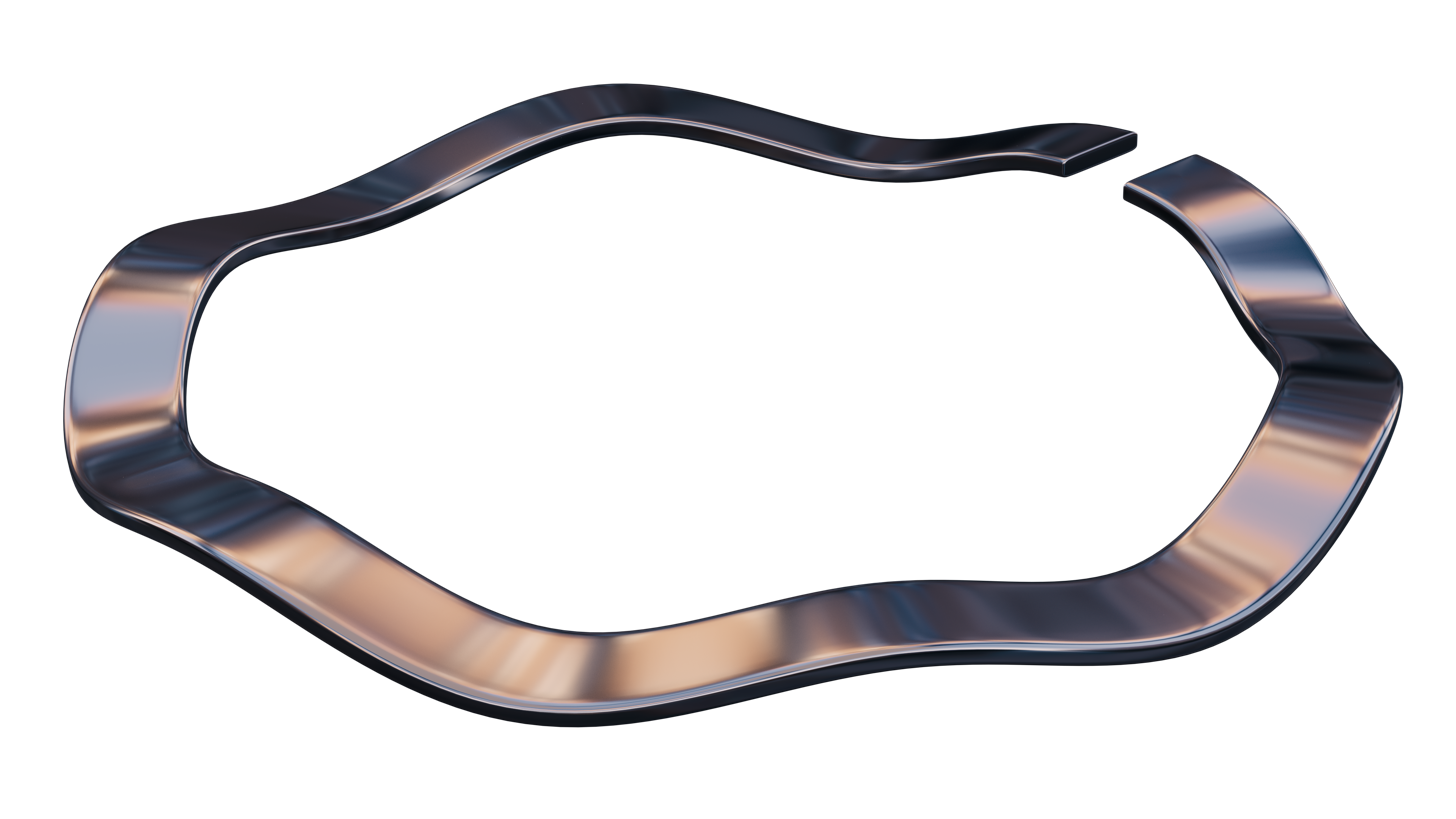
Single turn wave spring with gap

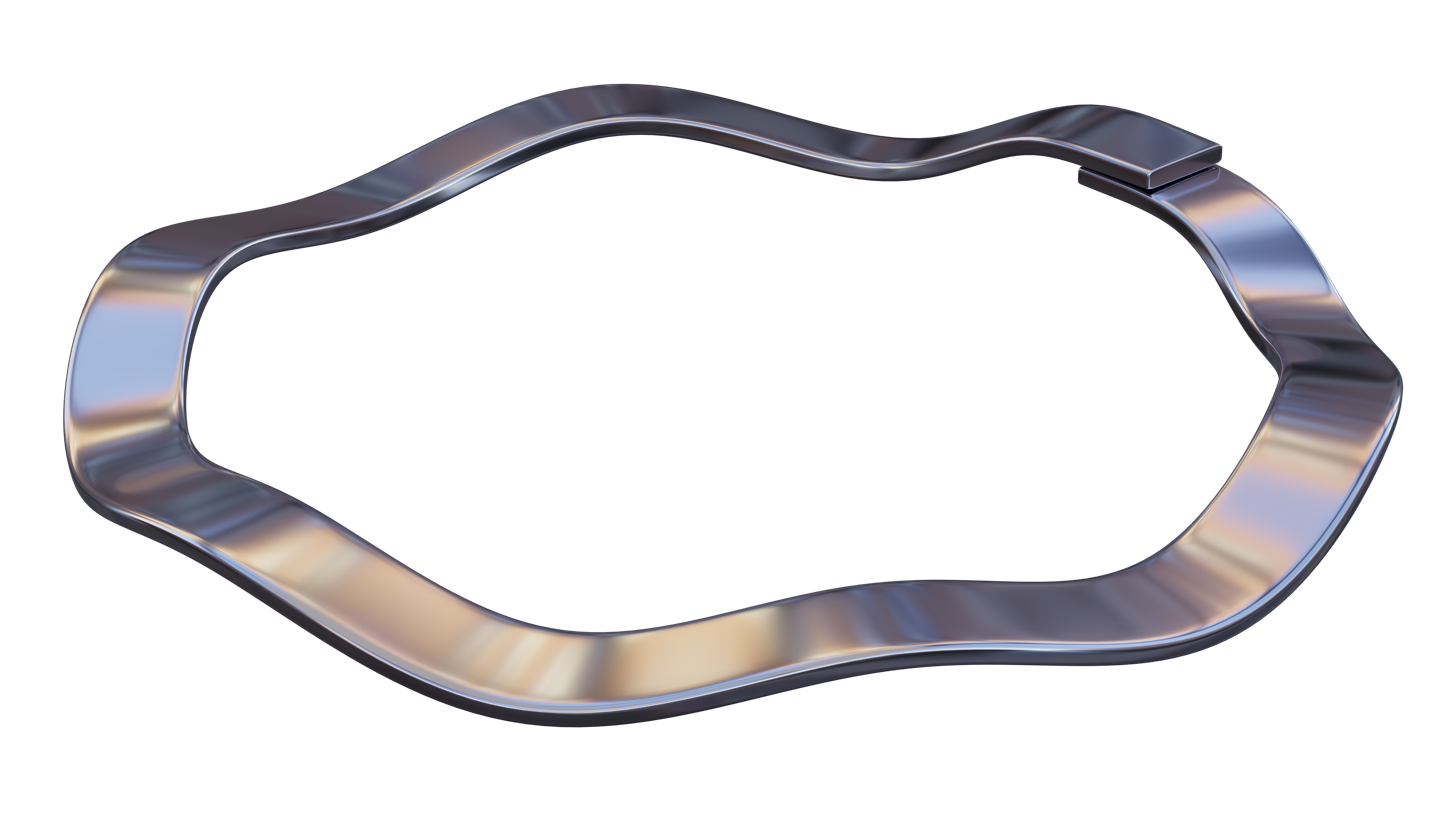
Single turn wave spring with overlapping ends

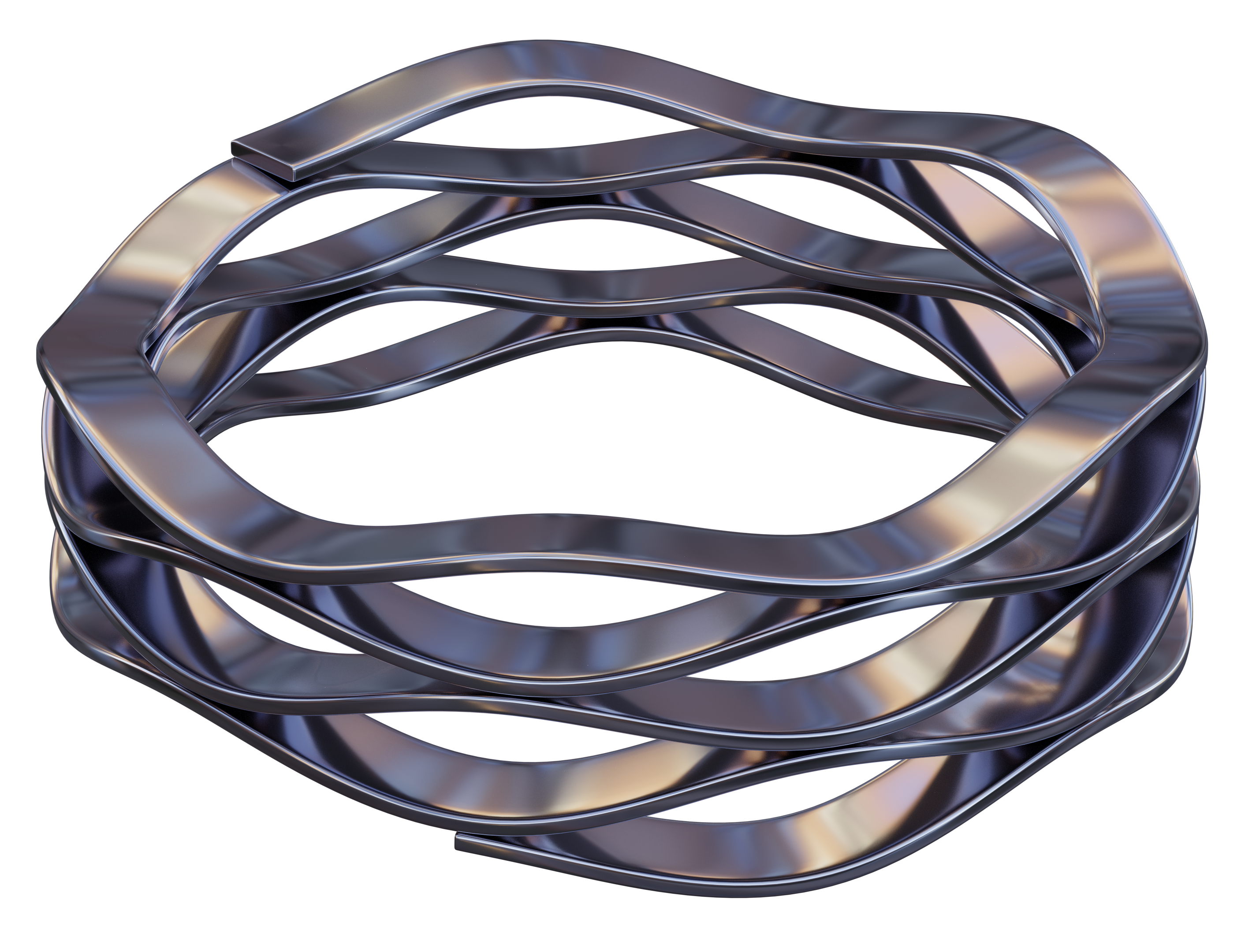
Multi-turn wave spring with plain ends

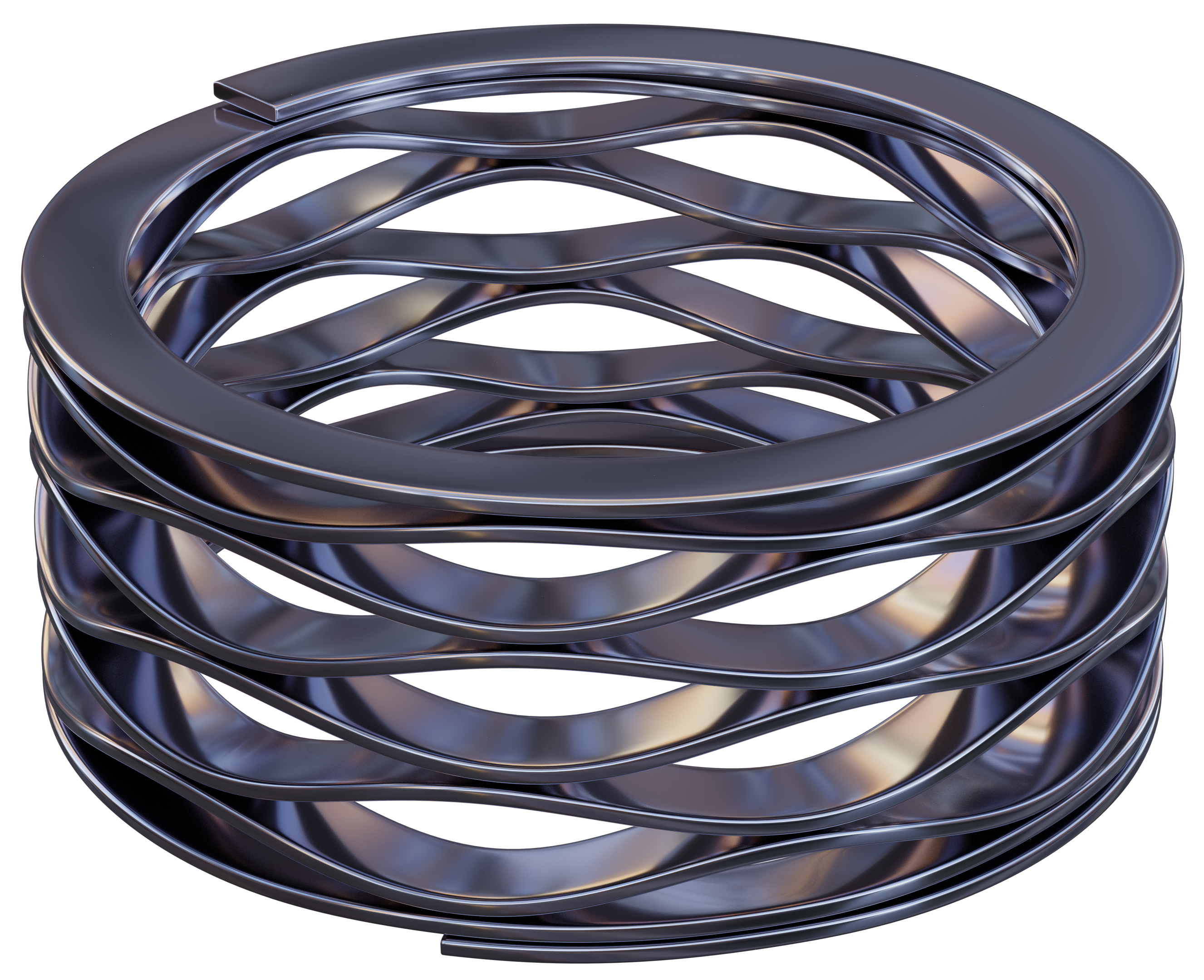
Multi-turn wave spring with shim ends

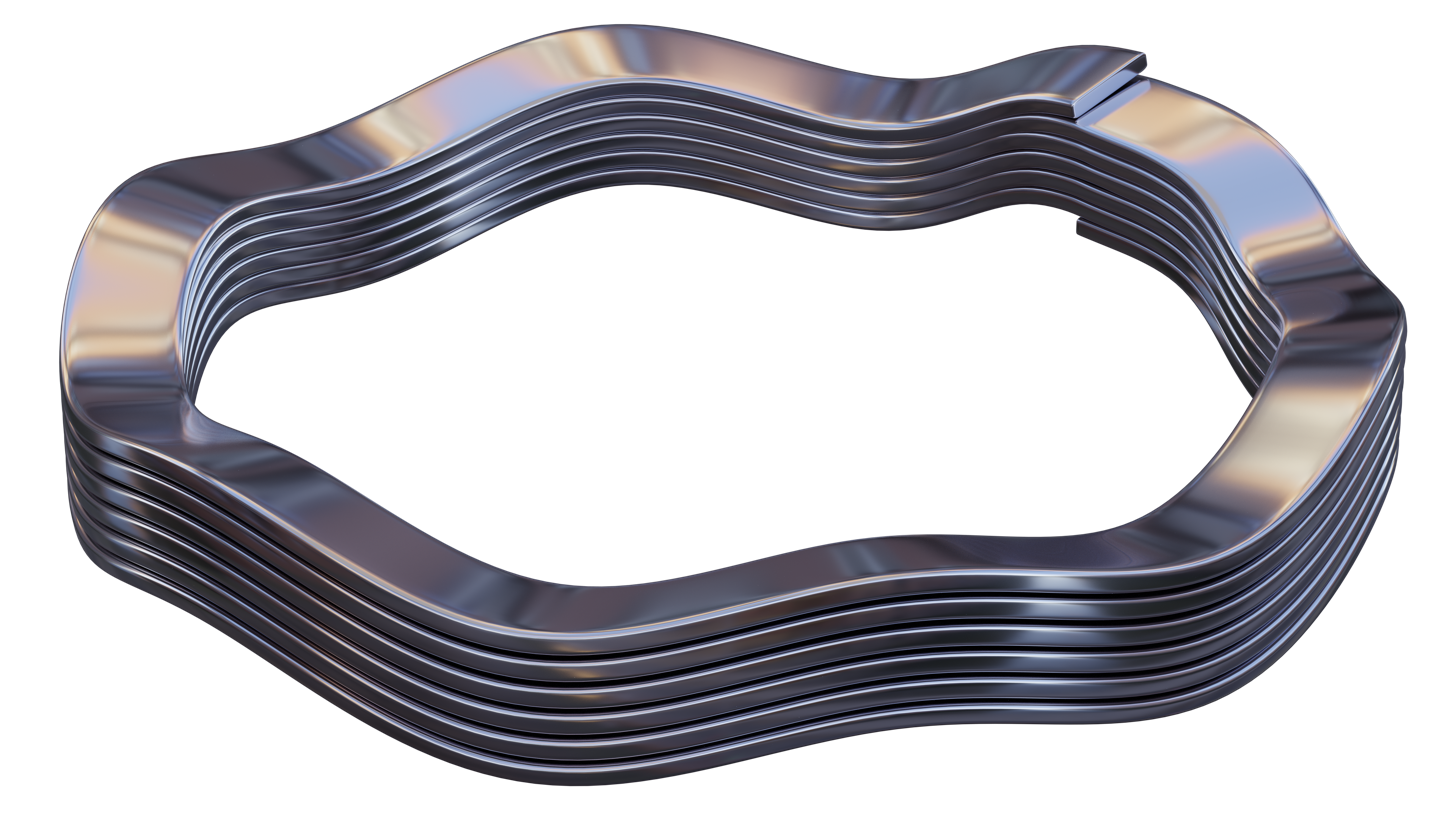
Nested wave spring with six turns

=== Single-turn wave spring ===
Single-turn springs are best for applications with short deflection and low to medium forces. The number of waves and material thickness can be changed to accommodate stronger forces. They are used for bearing pre-load.

=== Multi-turn wave spring ===
A multi-turn wave spring can decrease the needed axial space. It is suited for applications with large deflection and a small spring rate. A wide range of forces can be accommodated.

=== Nested wave spring ===
Eliminates the need to stack springs to accommodate higher loads. It produces high force while maintaining the precision of a circular-grain wave spring. It replaces a stack of belleville washers where a high but accurate force is needed.

=== Linear Wave Springs ===
a type of continuous wave-formed wire length produced from spring-tempered materials. They exhibit similar load/deflection characteristics to wave springs and can act as a load-bearing device.

=== Pitched Coil Springs ===
also known as a Wave Spring or a Zigzag Spring, is a type of spring that consists of a series of connected loops or waves formed in a zigzag pattern.

=== Interlaced wave spring ===
a type of spring that is formed by combining two constituent wave springs of similar thickness, amplitude, and frequency.

== Materials ==
- Carbon steel (standard)
- Stainless steel (best suited for high stress, fatigue applications)
- Beryllium copper (corrosion resistance, particularly in marine environments)
- Inconel (best suited for high temperature and corrosive environments)
- Elgiloy (corrosion resistance, particularly in marine environments)

== Citations ==
=== References ===
- Smalley Steel Ring Company. (2005). Engineering and Parts Catalog (Unknown ed.), Smalley Steel Ring Company
- Matsumura-Kohki Co., Ltd. (2009). Catalog, 2nd, Matsumura-Kohki Co., Ltd.
- Rotor Clip Company., Inc. (2010). Company Overview (4th ed.), Rotor Clip Co., Inc
- Rotor Clip Company., Inc. (2010). Product Specifications (12th ed.), Rotor Clip Co., Inc
- Rotor Clip Company., Inc. (2012). Wave Springs (1st ed.), Rotor Clip Co., Inc
- Lispring Company., Inc. (2009). Wave Springs (3st ed.), Lispring Co., Ltd.
