= Lanthanum-nickel alloy =

LaNi
Identifiers
CAS Number	12142-63-1

Properties
Chemical formula	LaNi
Molar mass	197.60
- Except where otherwise noted, data are given for materials in their standard state (at 25 °C [77 °F], 100 kPa). Infobox references

Lanthanum forms several alloys with nickel, including LaNi_{5}, La_{2}Ni_{7}, LaNi_{2}, LaNi_{3}, La_{2}Ni_{3}, LaNi and La_{3}Ni etc.

== LaNi_{5} ==
LaNi_{5}
Names
- Other names Lanthanum pentanickel Pentanickel lanthanum

Identifiers
CAS Number	12196-72-4

Properties
Chemical formula	LaNi_{5}
Molar mass	432.37
Appearance	gold solid
Density	7.950 g/cm^{3}
Solubility in water	reacts with water
- Except where otherwise noted, data are given for materials in their standard state (at 25 °C [77 °F], 100 kPa). Infobox references

LaNi_{5} is an intermetallic compound with a CaCu_{5} structure. It belongs to the hexagonal crystal system. It can be oxidized by air above 200 °C, and react with hydrochloric acid, sulfuric acid or nitric acid above 20 °C. LaNi_{5} can be used as a catalyst for hydrogenation reactions.

== Other alloys ==
In addition to LaNi_{5}, there are other alloys such as La_{2}Ni_{7}, LaNi_{2}, LaNi_{3}, La_{2}Ni_{3}, LaNi, and La_{3}Ni, and nonstoichiometric alloys such as LaNi_{2.286} (tetragonal, space group I4̄2m). The nickel atoms in La_{x}Ni_{y} can also be replaced by other atoms, such as LaNi_{2.5}Co_{2.5}.

== See also ==
- List of named alloys
