= Stakalloy =

Uranium-vanadium-niobium ternary alloy

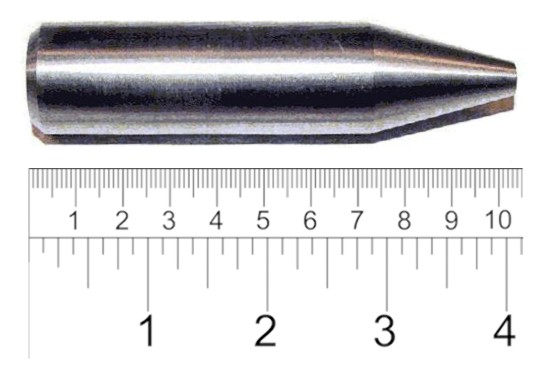
PGU-14/B incendiary 30mm round penetrator made of depleted uranium

Stakalloy is a ternary alloy of uranium composed of vanadium, niobium, and depleted uranium. The alloy was developed in 2002 by Michael R. Staker of Loyola University Maryland under grant from the United States Army.

== Composition ==
The niobium content of stakalloy is between 0.01 and 0.95 percent by weight and the balance being uranium. The vanadium content of the alloy is between the gamma eutectoid and the eutectic compositions, 1.0 percent and 4.5 percent by weight respectively.

== Properties ==
Stakalloy has improved metallurgical properties over other depleted uranium alloys, such as staballoy, being more viable as a structural alloy where a combination between high strength and high density is required. Changes include that of density, hardness, ballistic properties, and machinability.

== Production ==
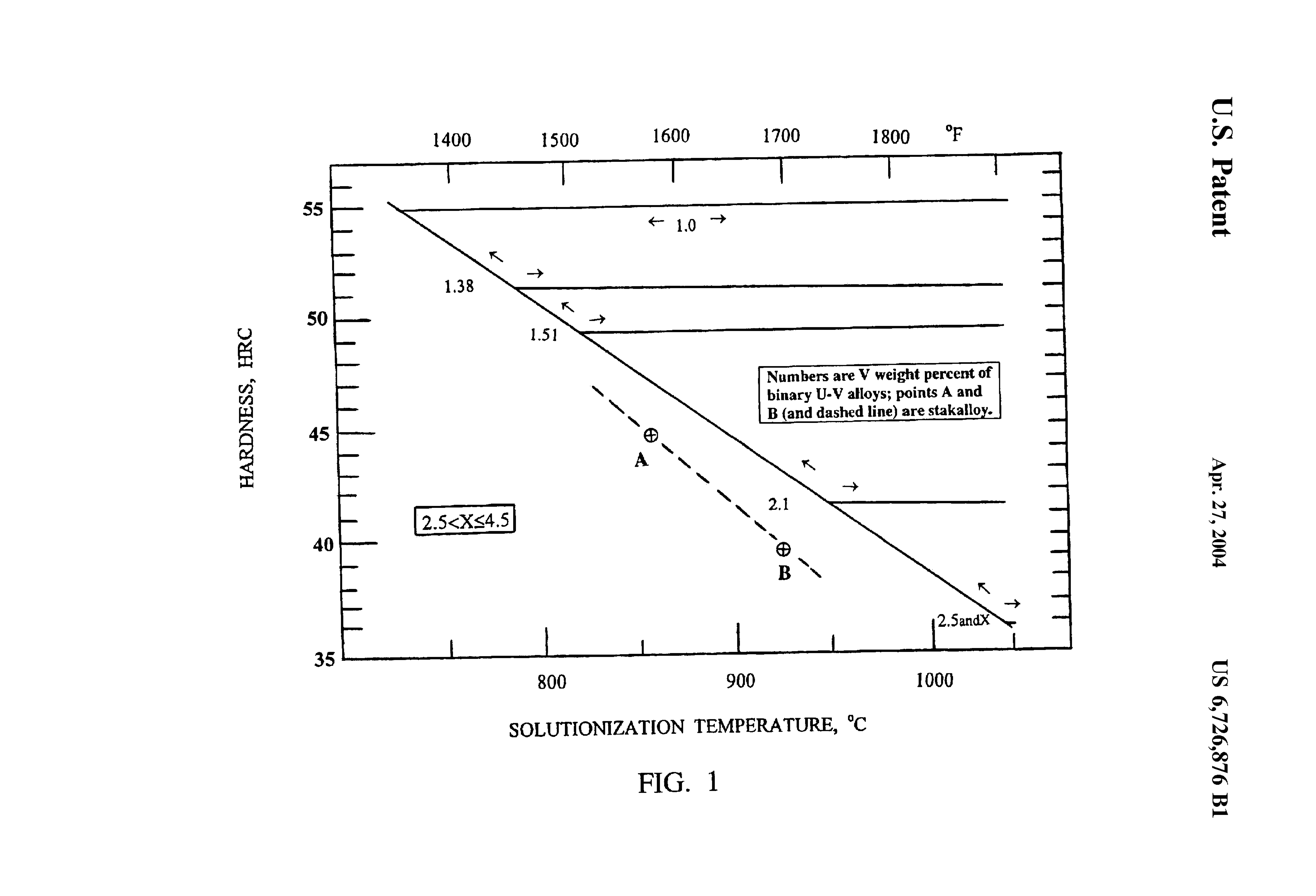
Solutionization temperature chart for stakalloy, as outlined in Staker's United States Patent

Staker's invention of stakalloy involved reducing excessive carbon levels while adding together uranium with trace amounts of niobium and vanadium. The three constituent parts may be combined through melting, however, the niobium and vanadium must be charged into the melt or introduced to additional melt stock before heat-up.

Arc melting is also a melting technique noted by Staker, in which niobium is added to an alloy of vanadium and uranium from a crucible.

After casting an ingot of stakalloy, the ingot can be used in the as-cast condition or be worked—either hot or cold—to change both properties and shape. Stakalloy can also be heat-treated after manipulation of shape.

== Uses ==
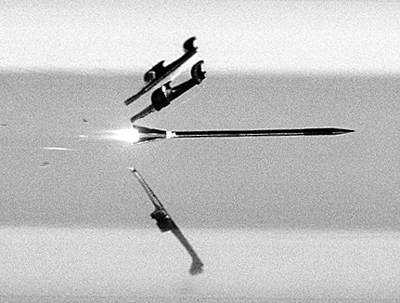
A sabot round, a type of kinetic penetrator, separating from its casing

Stakalloy may be a viable replacement for the United States Army's Advanced Kinetic Energy round. In 2007, Army Solicitation Notice W911QX-07-T-0053 entitled "Processing U-V-X Alloy Ingots" outlined work at Aerojet producing promising alloys with interesting material properties for future testing at the Army Research Laboratories.
