= Platinum sterling =

Trademarked metal alloys

Platinum Sterling is a registered trademark name of ABI Precious Metals, Inc. The trademark covers a range of alloys whose primary constituents are platinum and silver, primarily used in jewellery. The range of Platinum Sterling alloys was developed in 2003 by Marc Robinson, and its solder was created by Chuck Bennett.

== Properties ==
The platinum is used to replace at least some of the copper present in a typical sterling silver alloy, which provides a greater light reflectivity (by refining the grain structure) and resistance to tarnish (thought to be caused by oxidation of copper) than standard sterling silver.

Platinum Sterling is a cheaper alternative to white gold. It is also allegedly hard wearing and very white and so does not require rhodium plating like white gold.

== Composition ==
The composition of Platinum Sterling is published; three alloys are commercially available, all containing standard 92.5% sterling silver and 1%, 3.5% or 5% platinum. A small amount of gallium can also be added to the alloy to ease manufacturing. The patent application for Platinum Sterling claims:

A metal alloy having a composition consisting essentially of 90.5–95.5% silver by weight, about 0.5–6% platinum by weight, about 0.7–4% copper by weight, about 0.1–2% gallium by weight, about 1–3% tin by weight, about 1–2.5% germanium by weight, about 0.5–4% zinc by weight, and about 0.1–0.2% silicon by weight.

—

The claim also states:

...the preferred embodiments of the present invention provide a metal alloy comprising about 90.5–95.5% silver, about 0.5–6% platinum, about 0.7–4% copper, and about 0.1–2% gallium. In some embodiments, the alloy further comprises about 0.5–4% zinc, about 0–0.2% silicon, about 0–0.3% boron and about 0–1.5% indium. In other embodiments, the alloy further comprises about 0–3% tin and about 0–2.5% germanium.

== See also ==
- Platinaire
- List of alloys
