= Ti-6Al-2Sn-4Zr-2Mo =

Ti-6Al-2Sn-4Zr-2Mo (UNS designation R54620), also known as Ti 6-2-4-2, is a near alpha titanium alloy known for its high strength and excellent corrosion resistance. It is often used in the aerospace industry for creating high-temperature jet engines and the automotive industry to create high performance automotive valves.

== Chemistry ==
	Al	Sn	Zr	Mo	Fe	O	Si	C	N	H	Y	Remainder, each	Remainder, total
Min.	5.5	1.8	3.6	1.8	—	—	0.06	—	—	—	—	—	—
Max.	6.5	2.2	4.4	2.2	0.25	0.12	0.10	0.05	0.05	0.015	0.005	0.1	0.3

== Markets ==
- Aerospace
- Automobile

== Applications ==
Sources:

- High-temp jet engines
- Gas turbine compressor components (Blades, Discs, Spacers and Seals)
- High performance automotive valves
- Sheet metal parts in afterburners and hot airframe sections
- Aircraft brake parts (e.g. Boeing 787)

== Specifications ==
- AMS: 4919, 4975, 4976, 4979, T 9047
- MIL-T : 9046, 9047
- MIL-F: 81556, 82142
- Werkstoff: 3.7145
- EN: 3.71450
- GE: B50TF22, B50TF21, C50TF7, B50TF22
- PWA: 1220
- DIN: 3.7164
- UNS: R54620
