= Ti-10V-2Fe-3Al =

Ti-10V-2Fe-3Al (UNS designation R56410), also known as Ti 10-2-3, is a near-beta titanium alloy featuring an excellent combination of strength, ductility, fracture toughness and high cycle fatigue strength. It is typically used in the aerospace industry for critical aircraft structures, such as landing gear.

== Ti-10V-2Fe-3Al Chemistry ==
	V	AL	Fe	O	C	N	H	Y	Ti	Remainder Each	Remainder Total
Min	9	2.6	1.6	--	--	--	--	--	--	--	--
Max	11	3.4	2.22	.13	.05	.05	.015	.005	Balance	.1	.3

== Ti-10V-2Fe-3Al Markets ==
- Automobile

== Ti-10V-2Fe-3Al Applications ==
- Airframe components
- Landing gear components

== Ti-10V-2Fe-3Al Specifications ==
- AMS: 4983, 4984, 4986, 4987
- UNS: R56410
