= Zeron 100 =

Type of stainless steel

Zeron 100 is a super duplex stainless steel developed by Rolled Alloys (formerly Weir Materials). The alloy has excellent corrosion resistance combined with high strength. It typically contains 25% chromium and 7% nickel and 3.6% molybdenum along with copper and tungsten additions. Zeron 100 has a 50–50 austenitic–ferritic structure. It also has greater resistance to chloride pitting, crevice corrosion and stress corrosion cracking than exhibited by the standard 300 series stainless steels.

The UNS Designation of the Zeron 100 is S32760.

Zeron 100 with a composition of 25% chromium, 3.6% molybdenum and 0.7% tungsten has good pitting resistance to various chlorides and organics acids. Zeron 100 is made to meet a minimum pitting resistance equivalent (PREn) value of 40. The ferritic structure and alloy additions, such as nitrogen provide yield strengths that are twice that of 300 series stainless steels.

ZERON 100 plate is included in the ASTM A240 specification. Its minimum room temperature mechanical property requirements are 109,000 psi [751 MPa] (ultimate tensile strength), 80,000 psi [552 MPa] (0.2% offset yield strength) and 25% minimum elongation.

Zeron 100 has a copper addition which provides good resistance to sulfuric acid. For this reason, it is used in acid leach mining applications, steel pickling and other industries where sulfuric acid is encountered.

There are modified versions of Zeron 100 for specific applications. Zeron 100FG is a fastener grade of round bar. It is a cold drawn product with higher strength properties than standard Zeron 100. Zeron 100AFP is an advanced forging grade which has been developed for use in subsea oil and gas applications where good mechanical properties must be preserved at temperatures of about −70 °C.

== History ==
Zeron 100 Super Duplex was born from a research project undertaken by Dr Cecil Roscoe at the University of Manchester, England.

Tasked by his then employer – Mather+Platt – with studying the effect of various alloying additions on the mechanical properties and corrosion resistance of Zeron 25, he concluded that an optimum corrosion performance could be obtained from a duplex stainless steel with a PREn value of 40, containing low carbon and alloyed with optimum levels of Cr, Ni, Mo, Cu, W and N.

This discovery marked the invention and first use of the term 'super duplex' stainless steels.

Dr Roscoe returned to Mather+Platt and, working under the General Manager Dr Kevan Gradwell, branded the new material 'Zeron 100', before completing his PhD on 'The Structure-Property Relationship in a Series of Duplex Stainless Steels' some months later.

Mather+ Platt successfully marketed Zeron 100 primarily in the manufacture of their advanced centrifugal pumps for the oil industries, with the wrought form of Zeron 100 licensed by Mather+Platt to British Steel.

Ownership of Zeron 100 passed to Weir Pumps with their acquisition of Mather+Platt in 1987. In 2008, ownership then passed to Rolled Alloys with their acquisition of Weir Materials and Foundry.

== Industry applications ==
- Oil and gas
- Pulp and paper
- Power generation
- Seawater
- Mining and minerals
- Desalination
- Chemical processing

== Forms ==
- Bar
- Billet
- Fittings
- Pipe
- Plate
- Sheet
- Welding Products

== Specifications ==
- ASTM A 182
- ASTM A 182 (Grade F55)
- ASTM A 240
- ASTM A 276
- ASTM A 473
- ASTM A 479
- ASTM A 790
- ASTM A 815
- ASTM A314
- NORSOK MDS 055
- UNS S32760
- W. Nr./EN 1.4501
