= Titanium alloys =

Metal alloys made by combining titanium with other elements

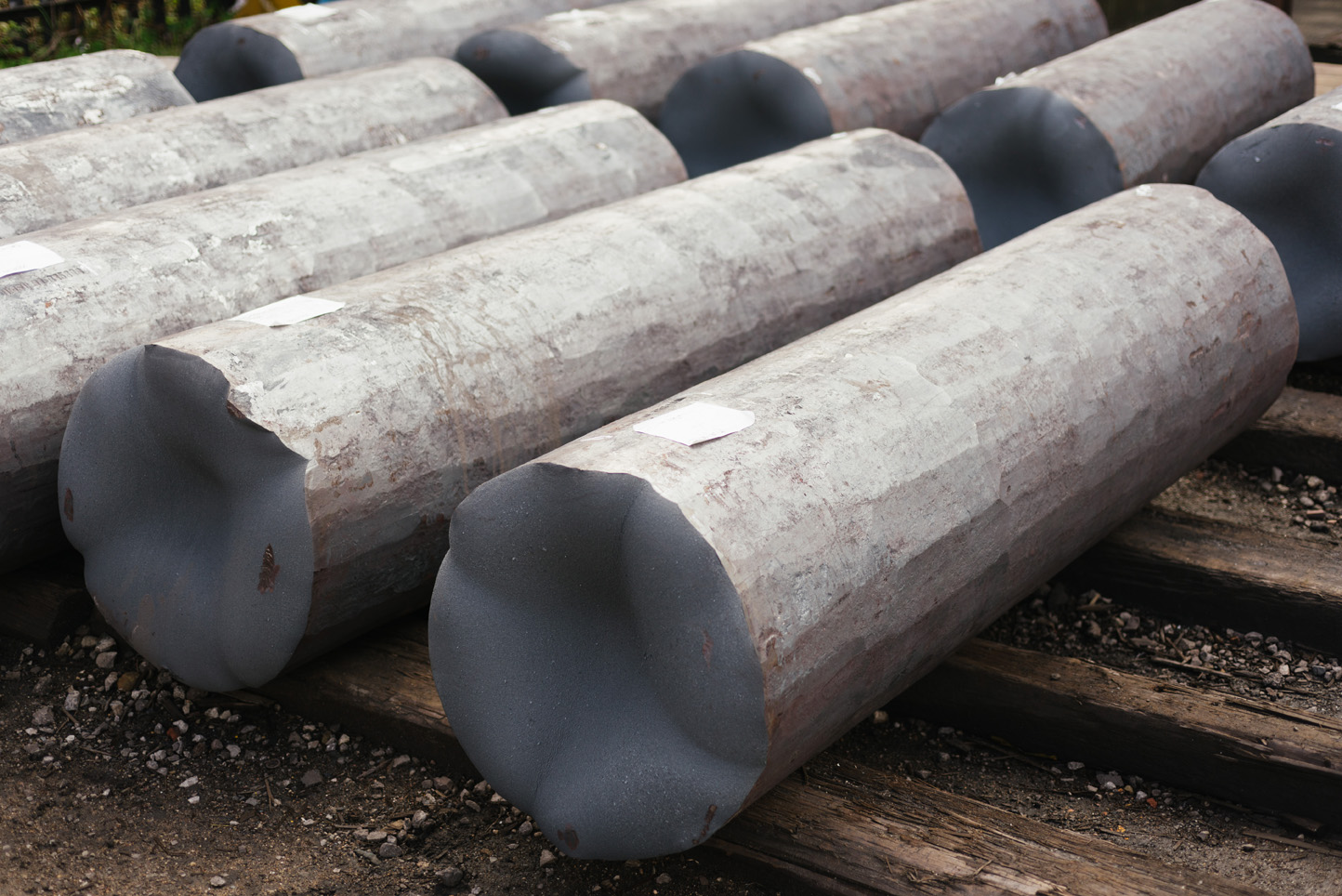
Titanium alloy in billet form

Titanium alloys are alloys that contain a mixture of titanium and other chemical elements. Such alloys have very high tensile strength and toughness (even at extreme temperatures). They are light in weight, have extraordinary corrosion resistance and the ability to withstand extreme temperatures. However, the high cost of processing limits their use to military applications, aircraft, spacecraft, bicycles, medical devices, jewelry, highly stressed components such as connecting rods on expensive sports cars and some premium sports equipment and consumer electronics.

Although "commercially pure" titanium has acceptable mechanical properties and has been used for orthopedic and dental implants, for most applications titanium is alloyed with small amounts of aluminium and vanadium, typically 6% and 4% respectively, by weight. This mixture has a solid solubility which varies dramatically with temperature, allowing it to undergo precipitation strengthening. This heat treatment process is carried out after the alloy has been worked into its final shape but before it is put to use, allowing much easier fabrication of a high-strength product.

== Categories ==
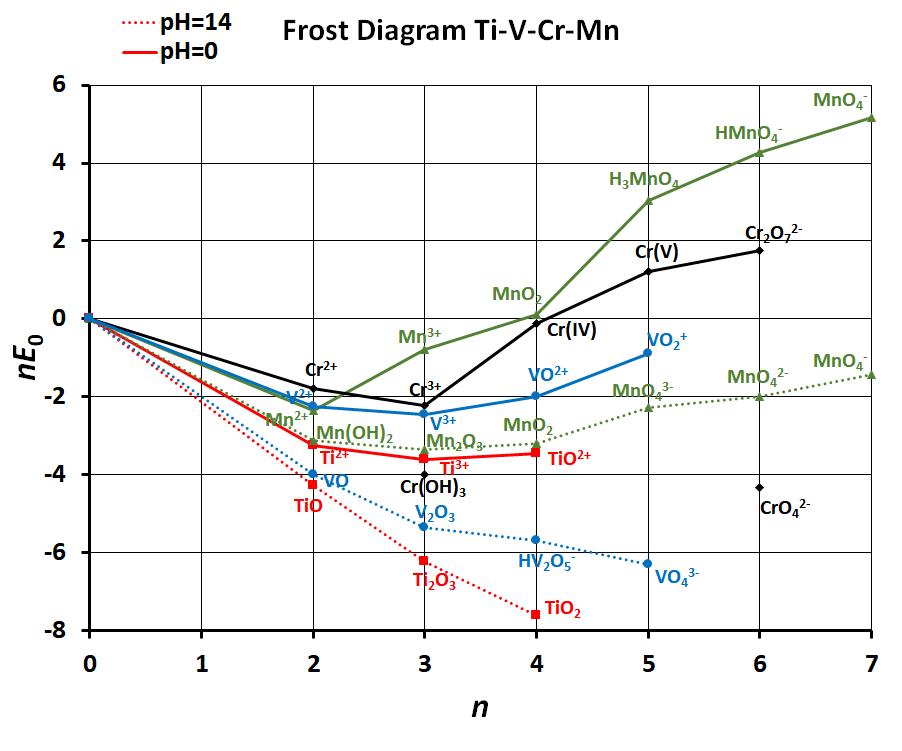
Frost diagram of various Ti alloys

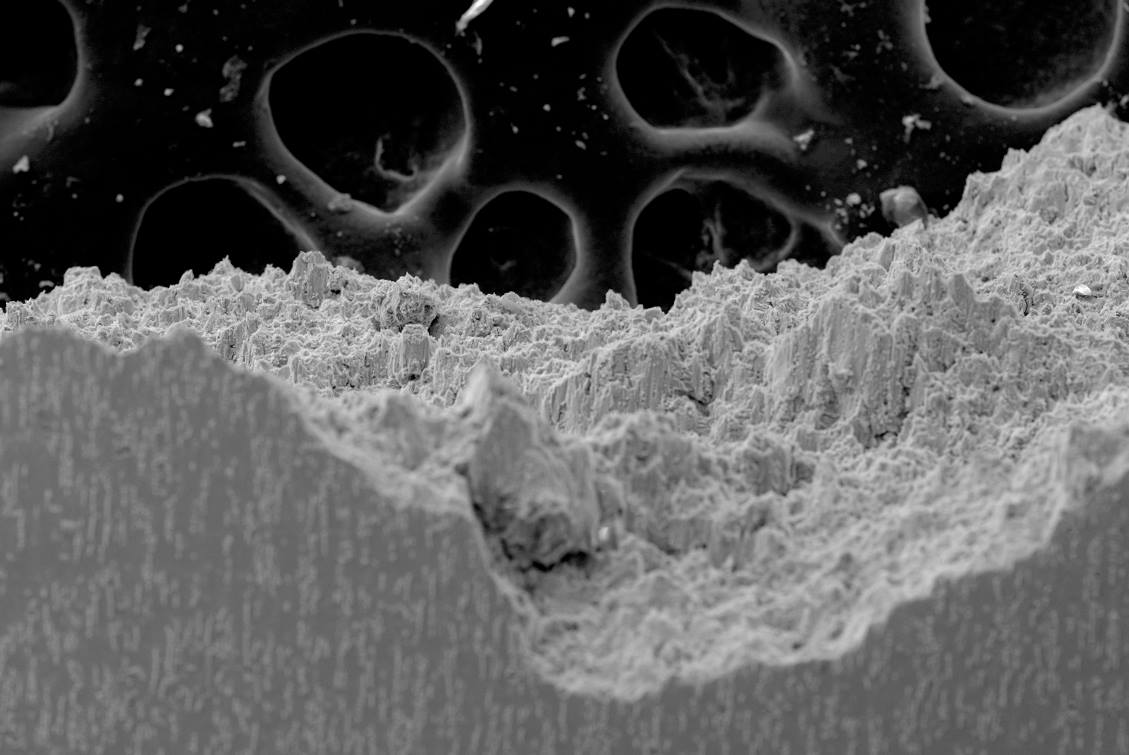
Fracture surface of a part made from titanium alloy

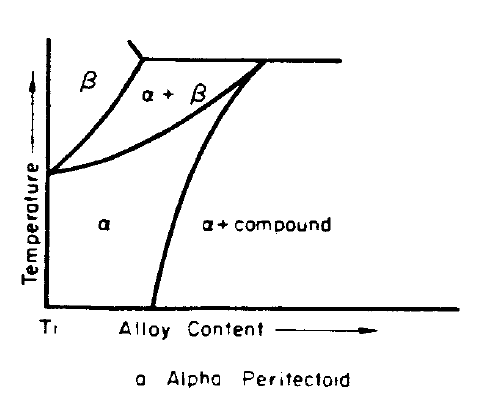
Titanium alloy constitution phase diagram - alpha peritectoid

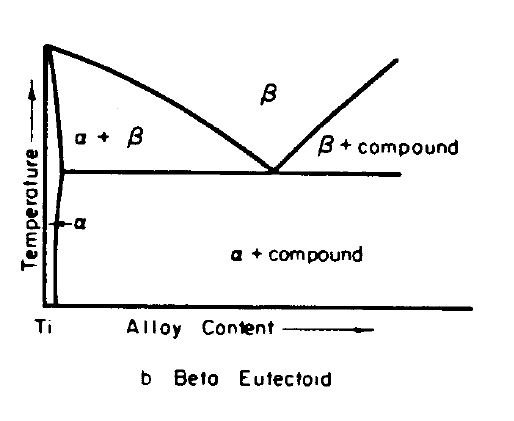
Titanium alloy constitution phase diagram - beta eutectoid

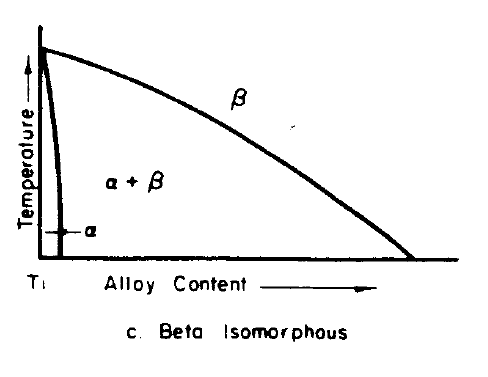
Titanium alloy constitution phase diagram - beta isomorphous

Titanium alloys are generally classified into four main categories, with a fifth miscellaneous catch-all.

- Alpha alloys which contain only neutral alloying elements (such as tin) and/or alpha stabilisers (such as aluminium or oxygen). These are not heat treatable. Examples include Ti-5Al-2Sn ELI (extra low interstitial) and Ti-8Al-Mo-V.
- Near-alpha alloys contain a small amount of ductile beta-phase. Besides alpha-phase stabilisers, near-alpha alloys are alloyed with 1–2% of beta phase stabilizers, such as molybdenum, silicon, or vanadium. Examples include Ti-6Al-2Sn-4Zr-2Mo, Ti-5Al-5Sn-2Zr-2Mo, IMI 685, and Ti 1100.
- Alpha-beta alloys, which are metastable and generally include some combination of both alpha and beta stabilisers, and which can be heat treated. Examples include: Ti-6Al-4V, Ti-6Al-4V-ELI, Ti-6Al-6V-2Sn, Ti-6Al-7Nb, and Ti62A.
- Beta and near-beta alloys, which are metastable and which contain sufficient beta stabilisers (such as molybdenum, silicon and vanadium) to allow them to maintain the beta phase when quenched, and which can also be solution treated and aged to improve strength. Examples include: Ti-10V-2Fe-3Al, Ti–29Nb–13Ta–4.6Zr, Ti-13V-11Cr-3Al, Ti-8Mo-8V-2Fe-3Al, Beta C, and Ti-15-3.
- Although uncommercialized in the west, binary titanium alloys with magnesium, potassium, calcium, and lithium have been produced in an arc melting pressure vessel at up to 140 atmospheres.

=== Alpha-titanium ===
Pure titanium is Alpha-titanium.

=== Beta-titanium ===
Beta titanium alloys exhibit the BCC allotropic form of titanium (called beta). Elements used in this alloy are one or more of the following other than titanium in varying amounts. These are molybdenum, vanadium, niobium, tantalum, zirconium, manganese, iron, chromium, cobalt, nickel, and copper.

Beta titanium alloys have excellent formability and can be easily welded.

Beta titanium is nowadays largely utilized in the orthodontic field and was adopted for orthodontics use in the 1980s. This type of alloy replaced stainless steel for certain uses, as stainless steel had dominated orthodontics since the 1960s. It has strength/modulus of elasticity ratios almost twice those of 18-8 austenitic stainless steel, larger elastic deflections in springs, and reduced force per unit displacement 2.2 times below those of stainless steel appliances.

Some of the beta titanium alloys can convert to hard and brittle hexagonal omega-titanium at cryogenic temperatures or under influence of ionizing radiation.

== Transition temperature ==
The crystal structure of titanium at ambient temperature and pressure is close-packed hexagonal α phase with a c/a ratio of 1.587. At about 890 °C, the titanium undergoes an allotropic transformation to a body-centred cubic β phase, which remains stable up to the melting temperature.

Some alloying elements, called alpha stabilizers, raise the alpha-to-beta transition temperature, (Note: In a titanium or titanium alloy, alpha-to-beta transition temperature is the temperature above which the beta phase becomes thermodynamically favorable.) while others (beta stabilizers) lower the transition temperature. Aluminium, gallium, germanium, carbon, oxygen and nitrogen are alpha stabilizers. Molybdenum, vanadium, tantalum, niobium, manganese, iron, chromium, cobalt, nickel, copper and silicon are beta stabilizers.

== Properties ==
Generally, beta-phase titanium is the more ductile phase and alpha-phase is stronger yet less ductile, due to the larger number of slip planes in the bcc structure of the beta-phase in comparison to the hcp alpha-phase. Alpha-beta-phase titanium has a mechanical property which is in between both.

Titanium dioxide dissolves in the metal at high temperatures, and its formation is very energetic. These two factors mean that all titanium except the most carefully purified has a significant amount of dissolved oxygen, and so may be considered a Ti–O alloy. Oxide precipitates offer some strength (as discussed above), but are not very responsive to heat treatment and can substantially decrease the alloy's toughness.

Many alloys also contain titanium as a minor additive, but since alloys are usually categorized according to which element forms the majority of the material, these are not usually considered to be "titanium alloys" as such. See the sub-article on titanium applications.

Titanium alone is a strong, light metal. It is stronger than common, low-carbon steels, but 45% lighter. It is also twice as strong as weak aluminium alloys but only 60% heavier. Titanium has outstanding corrosion resistance to seawater, and thus is used in propeller shafts, rigging and other parts of boats that are exposed to seawater. Titanium and its alloys are used in airplanes, missiles, and rockets where strength, low weight, and resistance to high temperatures are important.

Since titanium does not react within the human body, it and its alloys are used in artificial joints, screws, and plates for fractures, and for other biological implants. See: Titanium orthopedic implants.

== Titanium grades ==
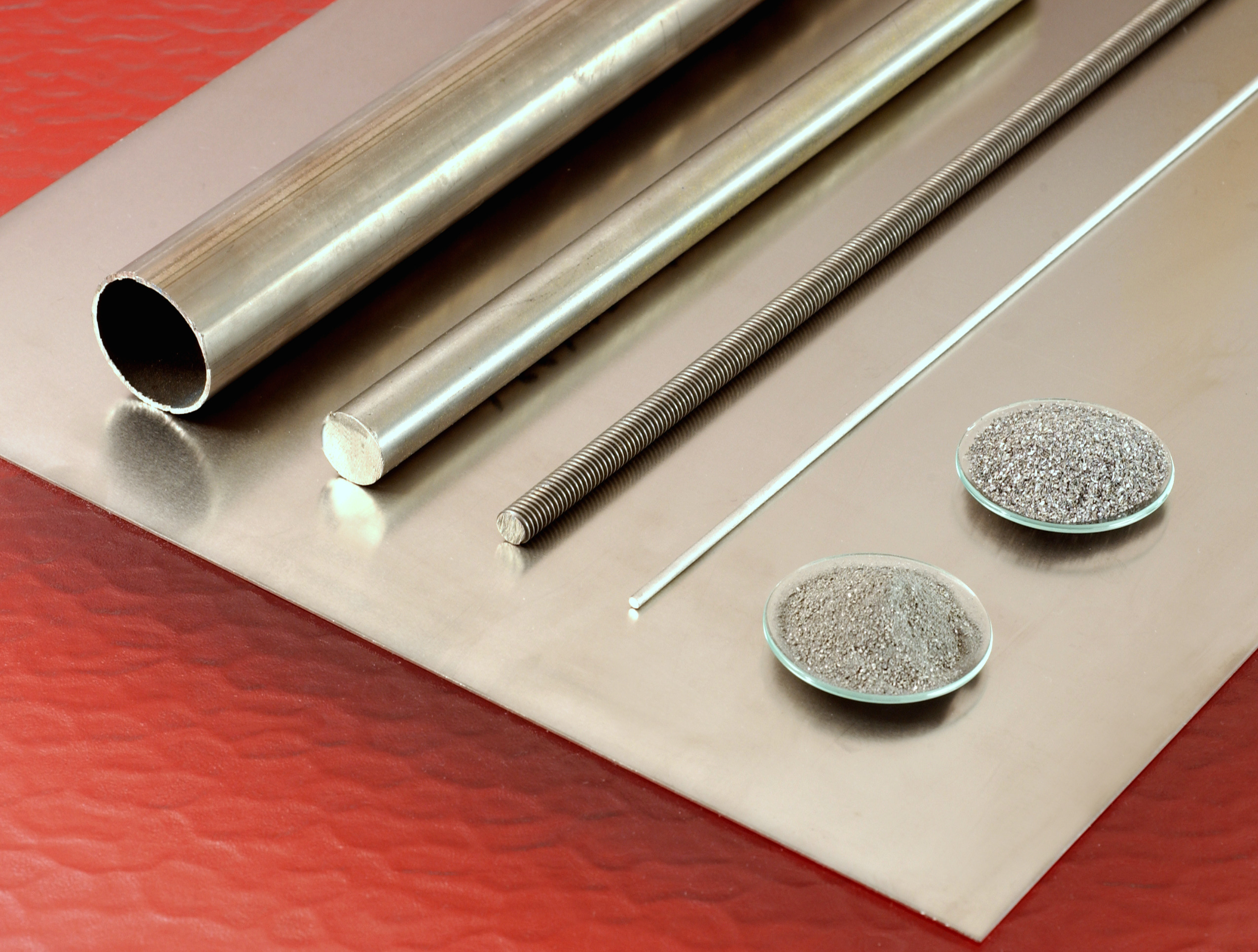
Titanium alloy products

The ASTM International standard on titanium and titanium alloy seamless pipe references the following alloys, requiring the following treatment:

- Grades 5, 23, 24, 25, 29, 35, or 36: Annealed or aged.
- Grades 9, 18, 28, or 38: Cold-worked and stress-relieved or annealed.
- Grades 9, 18, 23, 28, or 29: Transformed-beta condition.
- Grades 19, 20, or 21: Solution-treated or solution-treated and aged.

Materials with an H in the grade name (2H, 7H, 16H, 26H) are specified. These are identical to the corresponding numbered grade but with a higher minimum ultimate tensile strength. They are primarily intended for pressure vessel use.

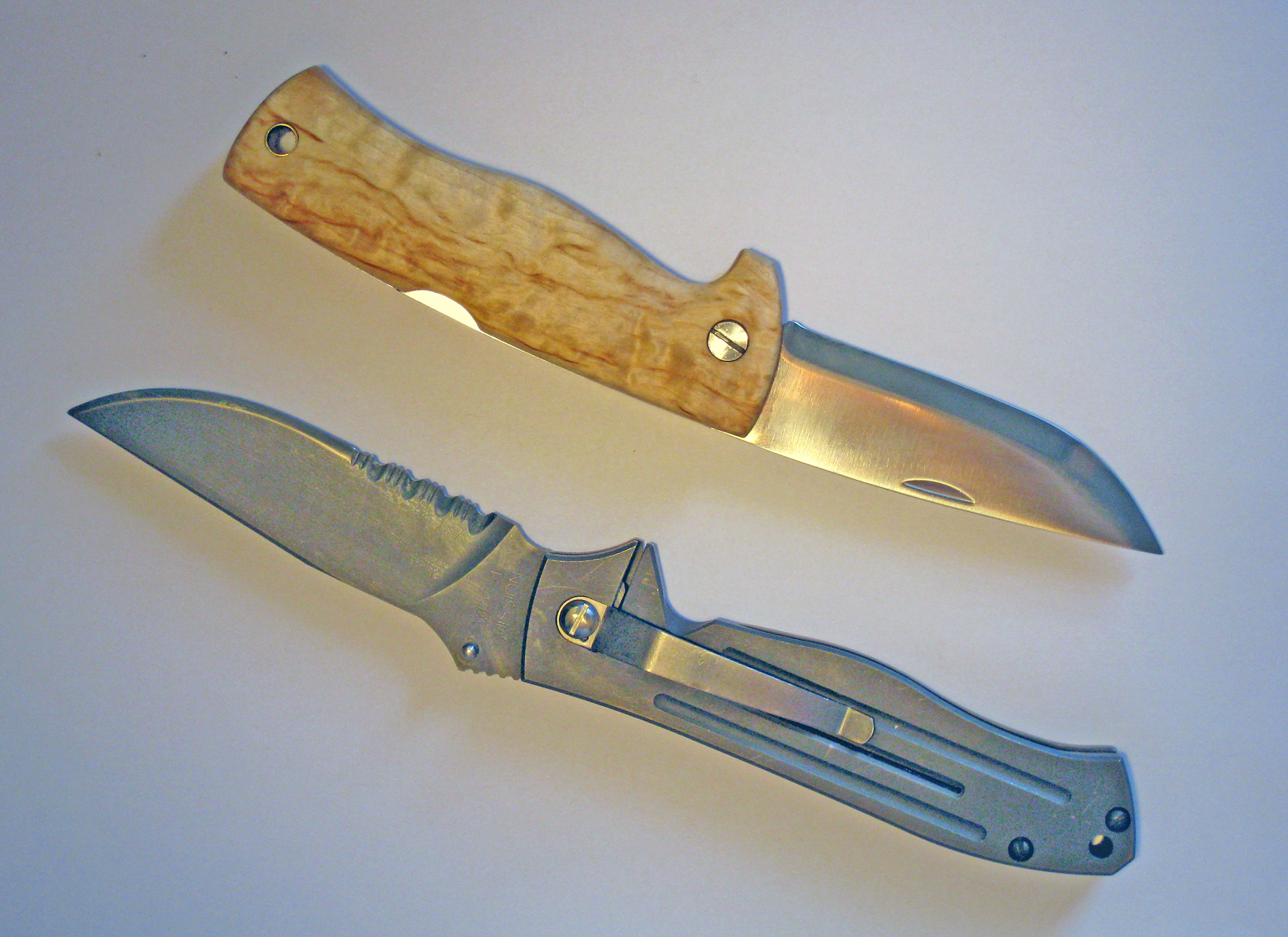
Titanium alloys make lightweight products like pocketknives

Grade 1
Is the most ductile and softest titanium alloy. It is a good solution for cold forming and corrosive environments. ASTM/ASME SB-265 provides the standards for commercially pure titanium sheet and plate.
Grade 2 and 2H
Unalloyed titanium, standard oxygen. 2H has a 58 ksi (400 MPa) minimum ultimate tensile strength.
Grade 3
Unalloyed titanium, medium oxygen.
Grade 4
Unalloyed.
Grade 5
Also known as Ti6Al4V, Ti-6Al-4V or Ti 6-4.

Turbine blade made from titanium alloy

Not to be confused with Ti-6Al-4V-ELI (Grade 23), this is the most commonly used alloy. It has a chemical composition of 6% aluminum, 4% vanadium, 0.25% (maximum) iron, 0.2% (maximum) oxygen, and the remainder titanium. It is significantly stronger than commercially pure titanium (Grades 1-4) while having the same stiffness and thermal properties (excluding thermal conductivity, which is about 60% lower in Grade 5 Ti than in CP Ti). Among its many advantages, it is heat treatable. This grade combines strength, corrosion resistance, weldability and fabricability. Generally, Ti-6Al-4V is used in applications up to 400 °C (752 °F).
Grade 6
Contains 5% aluminium and 2.5% tin. It is also known as Ti-5Al-2.5Sn. This alloy is used in airframes and jet engines due to its good weldability, stability and strength at elevated temperatures.

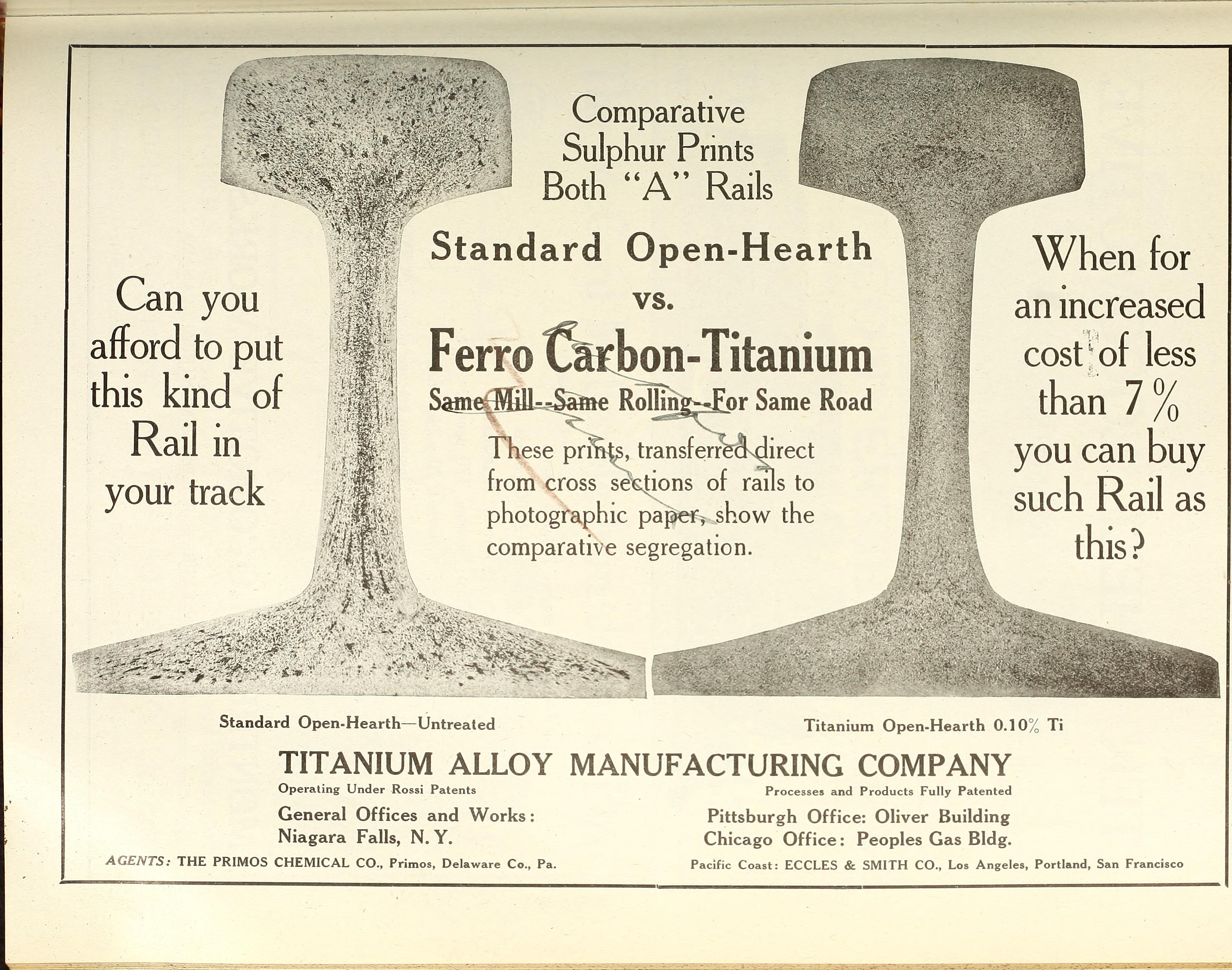
Rail cross-section was used to advertise titanium alloy as early as 1913

Grade 7 and 7H
Contains 0.12 to 0.25% palladium. This grade is similar to Grade 2. The small quantity of palladium added gives it enhanced crevice corrosion resistance at low temperatures and high pH. Grade 7H has a 58 ksi (400 MPa) minimum UTS).
Grade 9
Contains 3.0% aluminium and 2.5% vanadium. This grade is a compromise between the ease of welding and manufacturing of the "pure" grades and the high strength of Grade 5. It is commonly used in aircraft tubing for hydraulics and in athletic equipment.
Grade 11
Contains 0.12 to 0.25% palladium. This grade has enhanced corrosion resistance.
Grade 12
Contains 0.3% molybdenum and 0.8% nickel. This alloy has excellent weldability.
Grades 13, 14, and 15
All contain 0.5% nickel and 0.05% ruthenium.
Grade 16 and 16H
Contains 0.04 to 0.08% palladium. This grade has enhanced corrosion resistance.
Grade 17
Contains 0.04 to 0.08% palladium. This grade has enhanced corrosion resistance.
Grade 18
Contains 3% aluminium, 2.5% vanadium and 0.04 to 0.08% palladium. This grade is identical to Grade 9 in terms of mechanical characteristics. The added palladium gives it increased corrosion resistance.
Grade 19
Contains 3% aluminium, 8% vanadium, 6% chromium, 4% zirconium, and 4% molybdenum.
Grade 20
Contains 3% aluminium, 8% vanadium, 6% chromium, 4% zirconium, 4% molybdenum and 0.04% to 0.08% palladium.
Grade 21
Contains 15% molybdenum, 3% aluminium, 2.7% niobium, and 0.25% silicon.
Grade 23
Also known as Ti-6Al-4V-ELI or TAV-ELI.

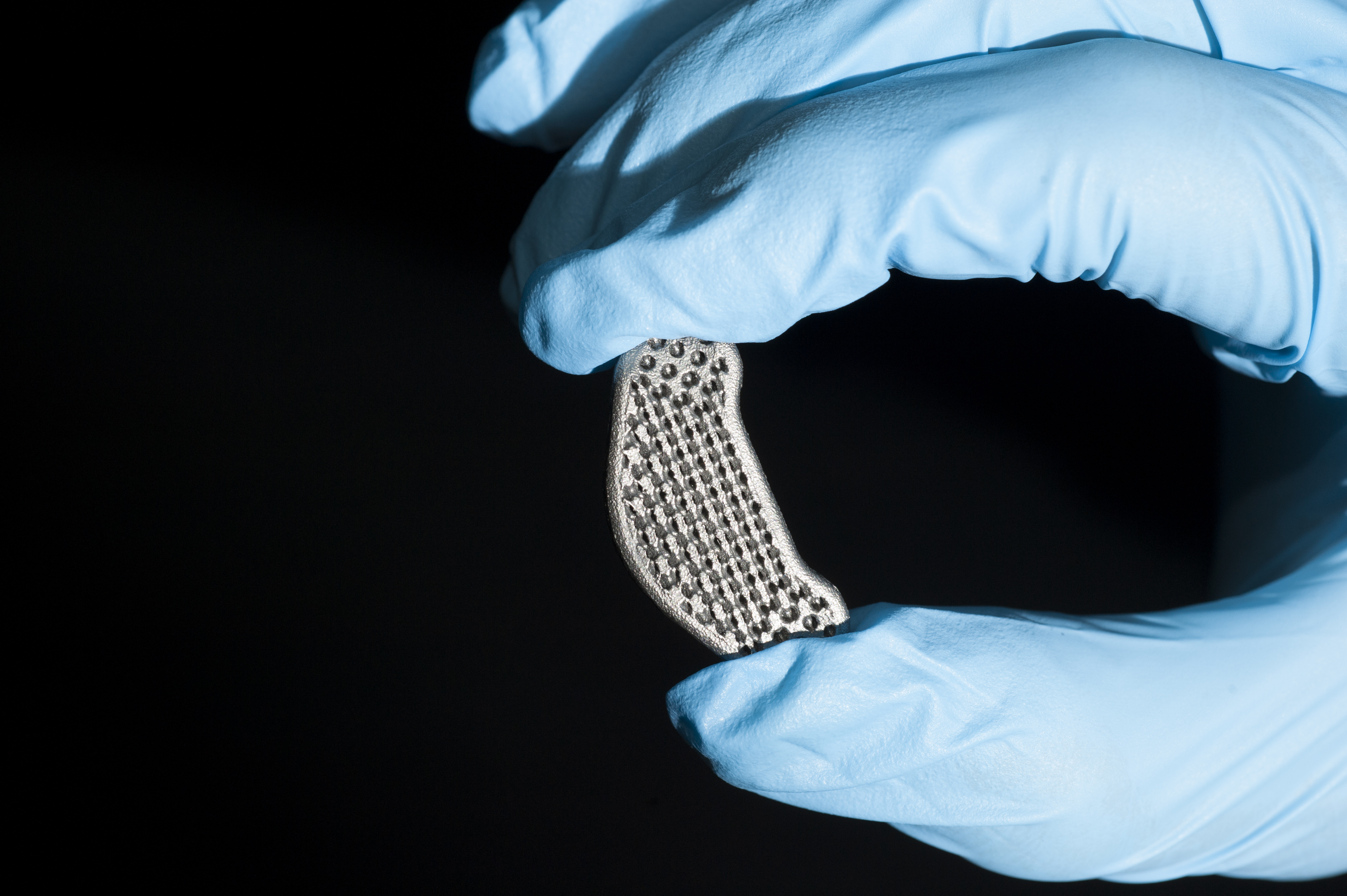
3D-printed spinal disc from titanium alloy

Contains 6% aluminium, 4% vanadium, 0.13% (maximum) oxygen. ELI stands for "extra low interstitial". Reduced interstitial elements oxygen and iron improve ductility and fracture toughness with some reduction in strength. TAV-ELI is the most commonly used medical implant-grade titanium alloy. Due to its high biocompatibility, corrosion resistance, fatigue resistance, and low modulus of elasticity, which closely matches human bone, TAV-ELI is the most commonly used medical implant-grade titanium alloy.

Ti-6Al-4V-ELI standard specifications include:

- AMS: 4907, 4930, 6932, T9046, T9047
- ASTM: B265, B348, F136
- MIL: T9046 T9047

Grade 24
Contains 6% aluminium, 4% vanadium and 0.04% to 0.08% palladium.
Grade 25
Contains 6% aluminium, 4% vanadium and 0.3% to 0.8% nickel and 0.04% to 0.08% palladium.
Grades 26, 26H, and 27

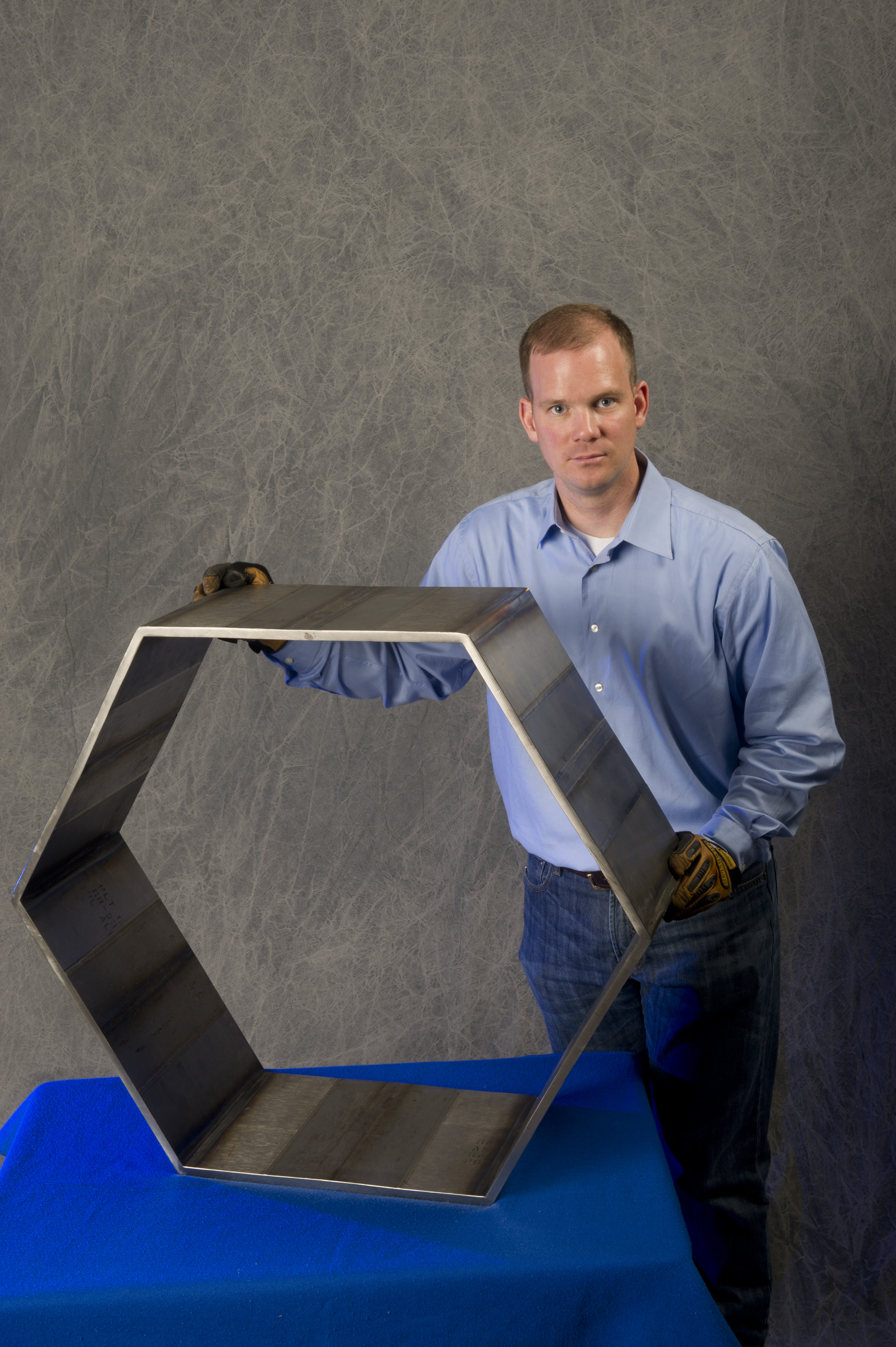
A hexagon formed from thermal stir welding of a titanium alloy

All contain 0.08 to 0.14% ruthenium.
Grade 28
contains 3% aluminium, 2.5% vanadium and 0.08 to 0.14% ruthenium.
Grade 29
contains 6% aluminium, 4% vanadium and 0.08 to 0.14% ruthenium.
Grades 30 and 31
Contain 0.3% cobalt and 0.05% palladium.
Grade 32
contains 5% aluminium, 1% tin, 1% zirconium, 1% vanadium, and 0.8% molybdenum.
Grades 33 and 34
Contain 0.4% nickel, 0.015% palladium, 0.025% ruthenium, and 0.15% chromium. Both grades are identical aside from minor differences in oxygen and nitrogen content. These grades contain 6 to 25 times less palladium than Grade 7 and are thus less costly, but offer similar corrosion performance thanks to the added ruthenium.
Grade 35
Contains 4.5% aluminium, 2% molybdenum, 1.6% vanadium, 0.5% iron, and 0.3% silicon.
Grade 36
Contains 45% niobium.
Grade 37
Contains 1.5% aluminium.
Grade 38
Contains 4% aluminium, 2.5% vanadium, and 1.5% iron. This grade was developed in the 1990s for use as an armor plating. The iron reduces the amount of vanadium needed as a beta stabilizer. Its mechanical properties are very similar to grade 5, but it has good cold workability, similar to grade 9.

== Heat treatment ==
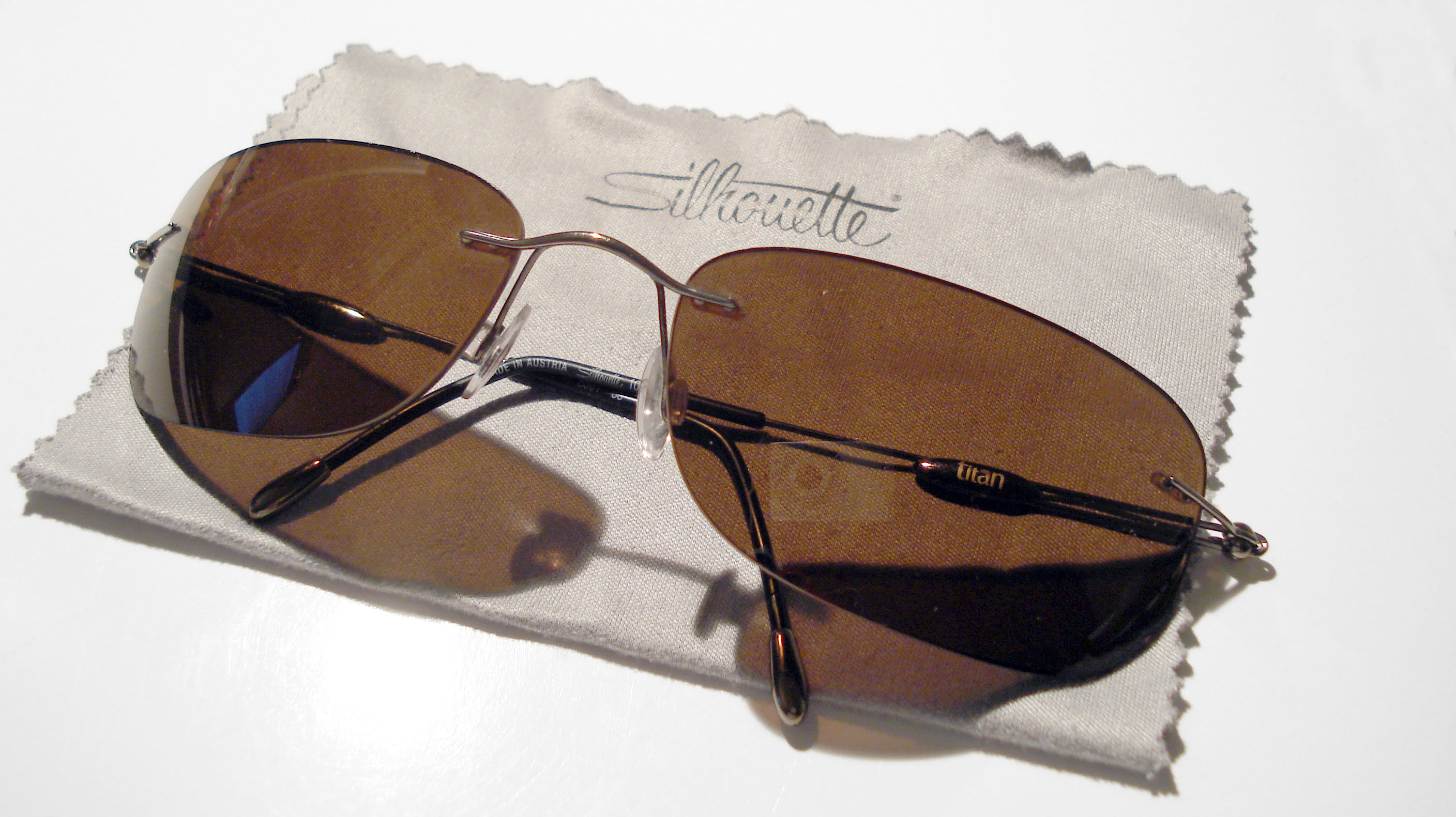
Titanium alloy used in frame of sunglasses

Titanium alloys are heat treated for a number of reasons, the main ones being to increase strength by solution treatment and aging as well as to optimize special properties, such as fracture toughness, fatigue strength and high temperature creep strength.

Alpha and near-alpha alloys cannot be dramatically changed by heat treatment. Stress relief and annealing are the processes that can be employed for this class of titanium alloys. The heat treatment cycles for beta alloys differ significantly from those for the alpha and alpha-beta alloys. Beta alloys can not only be stress relieved or annealed, but also can be solution treated and aged. The alpha-beta alloys are two-phase alloys, comprising both alpha and beta phases at room temperature. Phase compositions, sizes, and distributions of phases in alpha-beta alloys can be manipulated within certain limits by heat treatment, thus permitting tailoring of properties.

Alpha and near-alpha alloys
The micro-structure of alpha alloys cannot be strongly manipulated by heat treatment since alpha alloys undergo no significant phase change. As a result, high strength can not be acquired for the alpha alloys by heat treatment. Yet, alpha and near-alpha titanium alloys can be stress relieved and annealed.
Alpha-beta alloys
By working as well as heat treatment of alpha-beta alloys below or above the alpha-beta transition temperature, large micro-structural changes can be achieved. This may give a substantial hardening of the material. Solution treatment plus aging is used to produce maximum strengths in alpha-beta alloys. Also, other heat treatments, including stress-relief heat treatments, are practiced for this group of titanium alloys as well.
Beta alloys
In commercial beta alloys, stress-relieving and aging treatments can be combined.

== Applications ==
=== Aerospace structures ===
Titanium is used regularly in aviation for its resistance to corrosion and heat, and its high strength-to-weight ratio. Titanium alloys are generally stronger than aluminium alloys and lighter than steel. It has been used in the earliest Apollo Program and Project Mercury.

The Ti-3Al-2.5V alloy, which consists of 3% aluminum and 2.5% vanadium, was designed for low-temperature environments, maintaining high toughness and ductility even under cryogenic conditions in space. It is used in aerospace components such as aircraft frames and landing gear.

=== Architectural uses ===
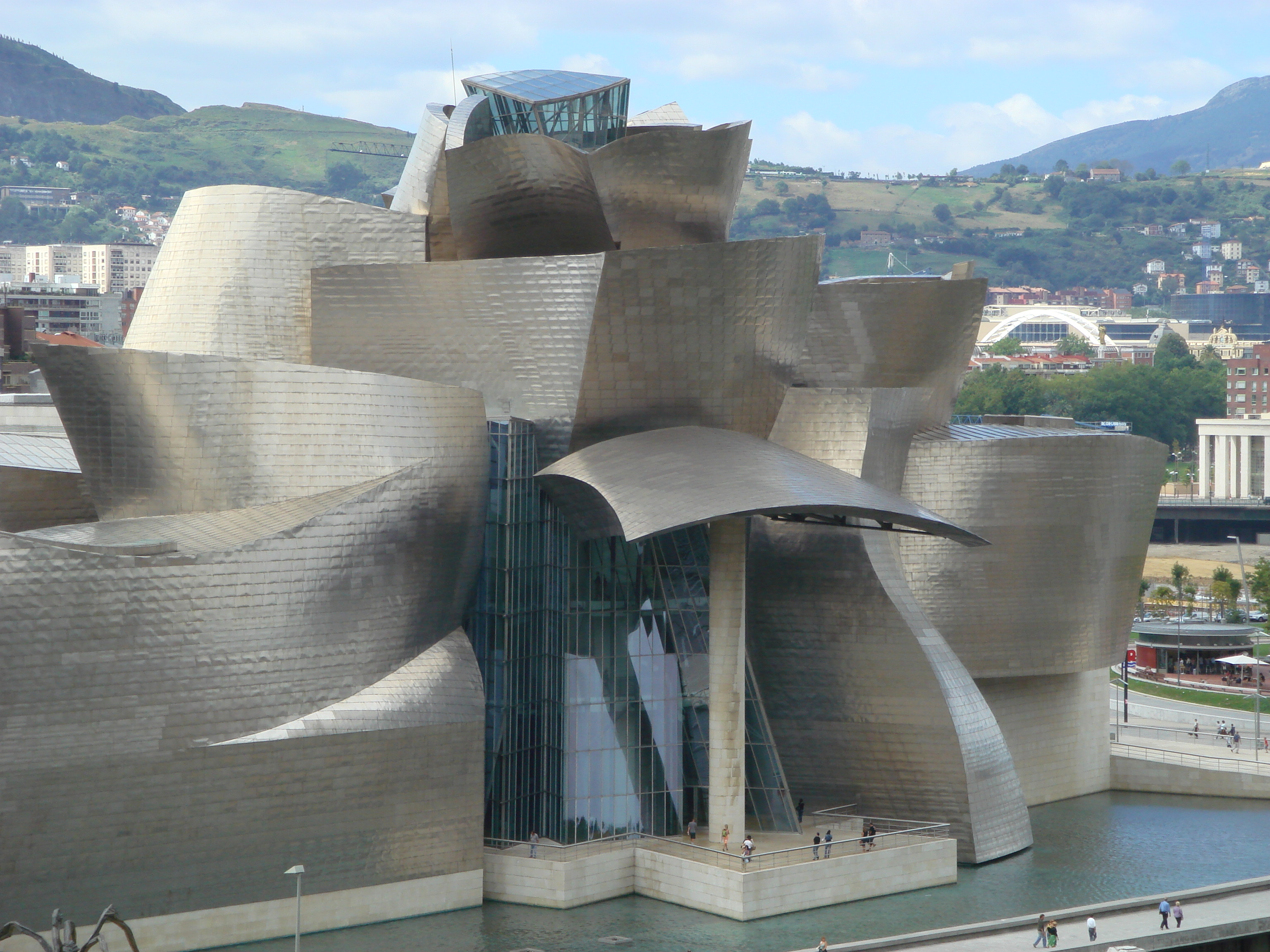
Titanium cladding of Frank Gehry's Guggenheim Museum in Bilbao

Titanium alloys have been used occasionally in architecture, such as with the cladding of the Guggenheim Museum, the architect of which being Frank Gehry.

=== Biomedical ===
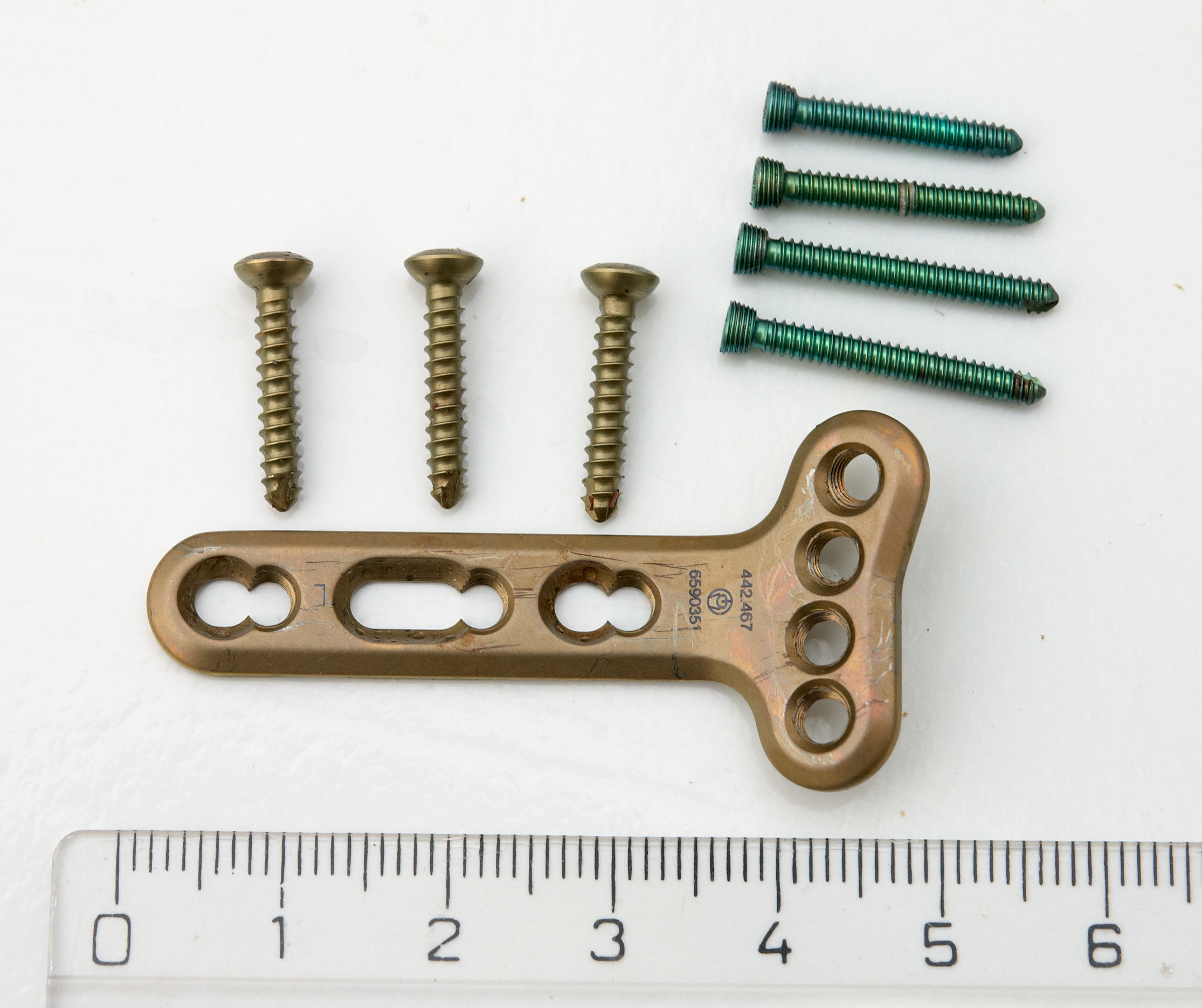
Titanium plate for wrist

Titanium alloys have been extensively used for the manufacturing of metal orthopedic joint replacements and bone plate surgeries. They are normally produced from wrought or cast bar stock by CNC, CAD-driven machining, or powder metallurgy production. Each of these techniques comes with inherent advantages and disadvantages. Wrought products come with an extensive material loss during machining into the final shape of the product and for cast samples the acquirement of a product in its final shape somewhat limits further processing and treatment (e.g. precipitation hardening), yet casting is more material effective. Traditional powder metallurgy methods are also more material efficient, yet acquiring fully dense products can be a common issue.

With the emergence of solid freeform fabrication (3D printing) the possibility to produce custom-designed biomedical implants (e.g. hip joints) has been realized. Tests show it's 50% stronger than the next strongest alloy of similar density used in aerospace applications. While it is not applied currently on a larger scale, freeform fabrication methods offers the ability to recycle waste powder (from the manufacturing process) and makes for selectivity tailoring desirable properties and thus the performance of the implant. Electron beam melting (EBM) and selective laser melting (SLM) are two methods applicable for freeform fabrication of Ti-alloys. Manufacturing parameters greatly influence the microstructure of the product, where e.g. a fast cooling rate in combination with low degree of melting in SLM leads to the predominant formation of martensitic alpha-prime phase, giving a very hard product.

Ti-6Al-4V / Ti-6Al-4V-ELI
This alloy has good biocompatibility, and is neither cytotoxic nor genotoxic. Ti-6Al-4V suffers from poor shear strength and poor surface wear properties in certain loading conditions:

Bio compatibility: Excellent, especially when direct contact with tissue or bone is required. Ti-6Al-4V's poor shear strength makes it undesirable for bone screws or plates. It also has poor surface wear properties and tends to seize when in sliding contact with itself and other metals. Surface treatments such as nitriding and oxidizing can improve the surface wear properties.

Ti-6Al-7Nb
This alloy was developed as a biomedical replacement for Ti-6Al-4V, because Ti-6Al-4V contains vanadium, an element that has demonstrated cytotoxic outcomes when isolated. Ti-6Al-7Nb contains 6% aluminium and 7% niobium.

Ti6Al7Nb is a dedicated high strength titanium alloy with excellent biocompatibility for surgical implants. Used for replacement hip joints, it has been in clinical use since early 1986.

=== Automobile industry ===
Titanium alloys are used in the automobile industry due to their outstanding characteristics. Key applications include engine components like valves and connecting rods, exhaust systems, suspension springs, and fasteners. These alloys help reduce vehicle weight, leading to improved fuel efficiency and performance. Additionally, titanium's durability and resistance to corrosion extend the lifespan of automotive parts. However, the high cost and manufacturing complexity of titanium limit its use mostly to high-performance and luxury vehicles.
