= Queen's metal =

Metal alloy

Queen's metal is an alloy of nine parts tin and one each of antimony, lead, and bismuth. It has an intermediate hardness between pewter and britannia metal. It was developed by English pewtersmiths in the 16th century; the recipe was initially a secret and was reserved for pieces made for the English royal family.
