= Sanicro 28 =

Alloy 28 or Sanicro 28 (trade name) is an alloy of iron which contains nickel and chromium. It is a material often used to withstand corrosion from oxidation and rusting. It is especially resistant to sulfuric acid and phosphoric acid. They are typically used by natural gas and oil transportation, Nuclear fuel transportation, acid manufacturing and transportation services.

Composition of Alloy 28
Element	Weight %
Ni	30–32
Fe	21–22
Cr	26–28
Mo	3–4
Cu	0.6–1.4
C	0.02
Mn	2
S	0.03
Si	0.70

== See also ==
- Stainless steel
