= Elgiloy =

Heat-treatable alloy

Elgiloy (Co-Cr-Ni Alloy) is a "super-alloy" consisting of 39-41% cobalt, 19-21% chromium, 14-16% nickel, 11.3-20.5% iron, 6-8% molybdenum, 1.5-2.5% manganese and 0.15% max. carbon.

It is used to make springs that are corrosion resistant and exhibit high strength, ductility, and good fatigue life. These same properties led to it being used for control cables in the Lockheed SR-71 Blackbird airplane, as they needed to cope with repeated stretching and contracting.

Elgiloy meets specifications AMS 5876, AMS 5833, and UNS R30003.

Due to its chemical composition, Elgiloy is highly resistant to sulfide stress corrosion cracking and pitting, and can operate at temperatures up to 454 °C.

Elgiloy is a trade name for this super alloy. Phynox is another trade name for the same super alloy.

== See also ==
- List of named alloys
