= AL-6XN =

Stainless steel alloy

AL-6XN (UNS designation N08367) is a type of weldable stainless steel that consist of an alloy of nickel (24%), chromium (22%) and molybdenum (6.3%) with other trace elements such as nitrogen.

The high nickel and molybdenum contents of the AL-6XN alloy give it good resistance to chloride stress-corrosion cracking. The molybdenum confers resistance to chloride pitting. The nitrogen content serves to further increase pitting resistance and also gives it higher strength than typical 300 series austenitic stainless steels, and thereby often allows it to be used in thinner sections.

This metal is commonly used instead of 300 series stainless steels in high temperature and low pH applications in food processing. For example, tomato juice will corrode 316L stainless steel at pasteurization temperatures of 100 °C (210 °F). AL-6XN will better resist this corrosion while still offering the beneficial properties of stainless steel.

AL-6XN chemistry
	Cr	Ni	Mo	C	N	Mn	Si	P	S	Cu	Fe
MIN	20.00	23.50	6.00	—	0.18	—	—	—	—	—	Remainder (50.32)
MAX	22.00	25.50	7.00	0.03	0.25	2.00	1.00	0.04	0.03	0.75	Remainder (41.4)

== AL-6XN applications and markets ==
Applications for superaustenitic stainless steel alloy AL-6XN include chemical processing, oil and gas, medical – sterilization and power generation with specific applications identified in desalination, water piping systems. transformer cases in marine environments, food processing equipment, FGD scrubbers, reverse osmosis, and heat exchangers.

== AL-6XN specifications ==
Specifications include:

- ASME SA : 182, 240, 249, 312, 479
- ASME SB : 366, 462, 564, 675, 676, 688, 691
- ASTM A : 182, 240, 249, 312, 479
- ASTM B : 366, 462, 472, 564, 675, 676, 688, 691, 804
- NACE : MR0175
- UNS : N08367
