= Megallium =

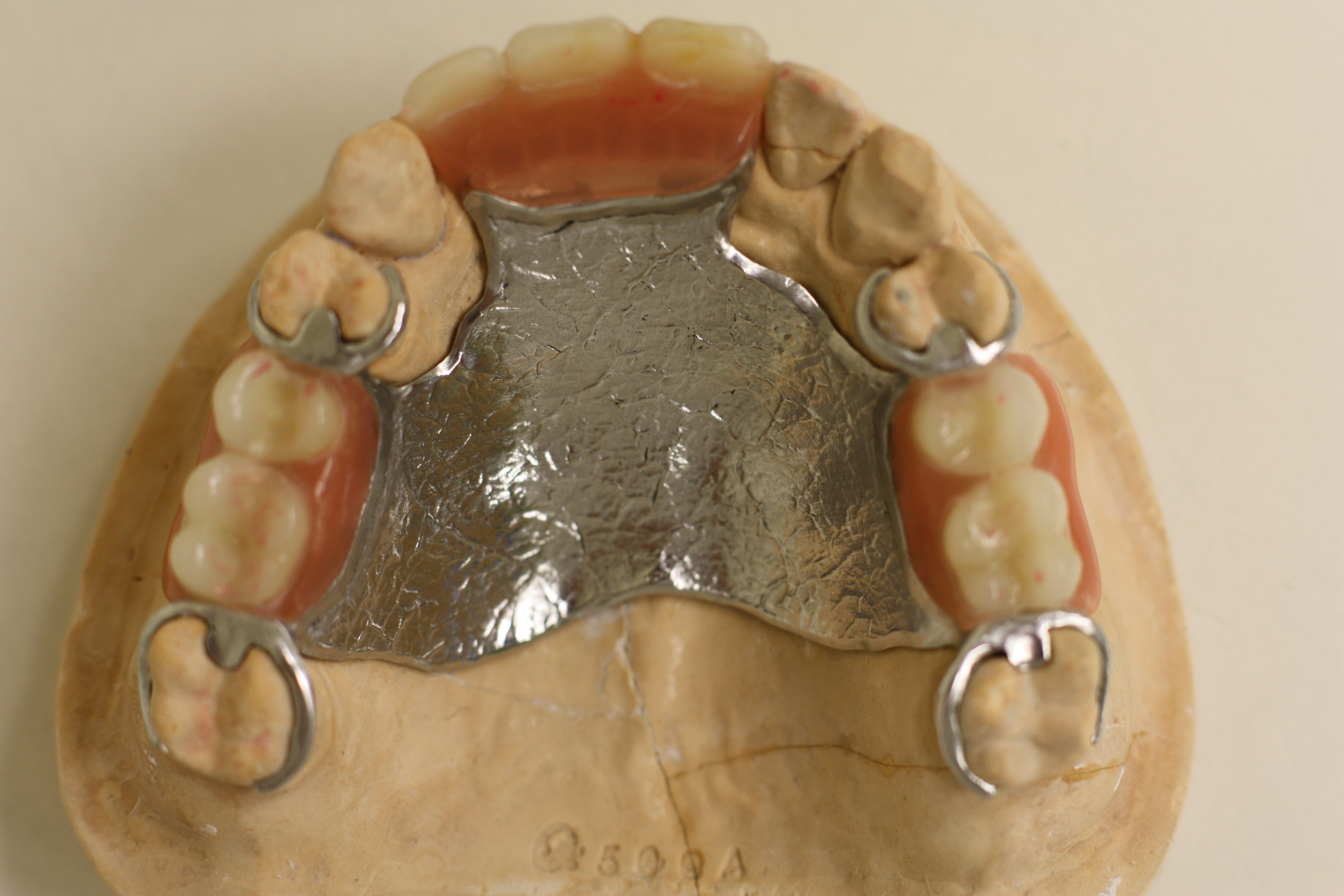
Oberkiefer Teilprothese 20100112 019.JPG

Megallium is a trademark for an alloy of 60% cobalt, 20% chromium, 5% molybdenum, and traces of other substances. The alloy is used in dentistry because of its light weight, resistance to corrosion and hypo-allergenic (nickel free) properties. Megallium was developed by John Leonard Attenborough for Attenborough Dental Laboratories in 1951.
