= Terne =

Alloy of lead and tin

Terne plate is a form of tinplate: a thin steel sheet coated with an alloy of lead and tin. The terne alloy was in the ratio of 10-20% tin and the remainder lead. The low tin content made it cheaper than other tinplates.

Terne plate was used for tinsmithed sheet metal goods, such as storage vessels, jugs and funnels, particularly for industrial use with flammable liquids. Unlike tinplate, it was not used for long-term storage or around food items, owing to the high lead content. Terne plate has also been used for roofing, as a cheaper alternative to zinc or lead.

Until 2012 lead had been replaced with the metal zinc and was used in the ratio of 50% tin and 50% zinc. This alloy had a low melting point of approximately 360 °F (182 °C) but is no longer available. Today terne-coated metal is coated with 99.9% tin, instead of hot-dipping, a more consistent galvanic deposition process is applied. Additionally the substrate has been changed from steel to stainless steel, benefitting from the corrosion resistance of stainless steel alloys. The pure tin alloy makes soldering easier, as the melting point is homogenised and doesn't need to match the melting point of two metals with different melting temperatures.

== Use ==
Terne was historically used to coat sheet steel to inhibit corrosion. It was one of the cheapest alloys suitable for this, and the tin content was kept at a minimum while still adhering to a hot-dipped iron sheet, to minimize the cost.

Historical terne metal must be painted. Terne metal can last 90 years or more if the paint is maintained. Terne-coated stainless steel (TCS II or Roofinox), or copper is commonly used to replace terne metal roofs as either material will outlast terne metal. Terne-coated stainless steel roofing can last 100 years or more unpainted; copper roofing can last 50 years or more unpainted.

Terne II used zinc in place of lead for environmental reasons. Today's aesthetic behavior is the main reason and benefit of the tin coating. Tin develops a natural matte grey patina when exposed to the elements. The result of the weathering process depends on the environment and climate conditions present. Depending on the environment and atmospheric conditions different substrate alloys are used. The stainless steel alloy 439 is ferritic and is used for normal environments; for coastal applications, the austenitic stainless steel alloy 316L is used providing an increased corrosion resistance to chlorides.

== Terminology ==
The term "terne" is derived from the French word for "dull" and was probably in reference to its dull appearance in comparison to the shiny surface of tinplate.

Terne-coated steel is also known as terne-metal and often referred to as "tin" (see the Slate Roof Bible). Traditional terne-coated steel cannot be purchased anymore; it has been replaced by a terne-coated stainless steel product (Roofinox tin-plated (Terne)), available at most roofing supply stores.

== See also ==
- International Tin Council
- Tinning
- Cassiterides
- Tin pest
