= Florentine bronze =

Florentine bronze is a modern term for a type of bronzed metal.

Prior to 1828, the primary artificial bronze used for copper and copper alloys was antique green of various shades. A metal colouring called "Florentine bronze" was introduced by a French man named Lafleur around 1828 and soon became popular. A variation, Florentine fremé ("smoked" bronze), was introduced by another French man named Camus in 1833.

The alloy is usually formed as a mixture of aluminium or tin (<10%) and copper (>90%). Currently no chemical formula for Florentine bronze has been made as it is an alloy which is not standardised (in proportions) worldwide.

"Florentine bronze" bears no relation to the 16th century bronze reductions of full-scale sculptures that were made in Florence after models by Giambologna and other Mannerist sculptors, to satisfy a collectors' market.
