= Rhodite =

Rhodite or rhodian gold is a naturally occurring alloy of gold and rhodium found in gold ore. Gold ore containing 34 to 43% rhodium was reported from Mexico and Colombia in 1825. The alloy displays brittle tendencies and has a density of 15.5 - 16.8 g/cm^{3}.
