= Alloy 230 =

Nickel alloy

Alloy 230 is a nickel alloy, made up of mostly nickel and chromium, with smaller amounts of tungsten and molybdenum. This combination of metals results in a number of desirable properties including excellent strength, oxidation resistance at temperatures of up to 2,100 °F (1,150 °C) and nitriding-resistance. Alloy 230 is one of the most nitriding-resistant alloys available.

== Composition ==
%	Nickel (Ni)	Chromium (Cr)	Tungsten (W)	Molybdenum (Mo)	Cobalt (Co)	Aluminium (Al)	Lanthanum (La)	Manganese (Mn)	Carbon (C)	Silicon (Si)
Min	47	20	13	1	-	0.2	0.005	0.3	0.05	0.25
Max	65	24	15	3	5	0.5	0.005	1	0.15	0.75

== Properties ==
Alloy 230 is also identified by the UNS number UNSN06230. It displays excellent strength at high temperatures, which is why it is often used in high temperature applications such as combustion linings on turbine engines, burner flame shrouds and furnace retorts. It also displays oxidation resistance at temperatures of up to 2,100 °F (1,150 °C), which again makes it ideal for high temperature applications. Its exceptional nitriding-resistance also makes it the preferred choice for nitriding furnace internal parts, as it remains unaffected by the treatment. It is also easily weldable and can be formed by hot or cold-working.
