= Rolled Alloys =

Private company

Rolled Alloys Inc
- Type: Private company
- Founded: Incorporated in 1953
- Headquarters: Toledo, Ohio, U.S.
- Area served: Worldwide
- Key people: Kenneth J. Reinke; President
- Website: www.rolledalloys.com

Rolled Alloys is a privately held metal supplier based in Toledo, Ohio, specializing in heat-resistant and corrosion-resistant alloys. The company serves various industries, including aerospace, chemical processing, medical, and power generation, with a global presence.

The company has between 201-500 employees throughout the world. Rolled Alloys' key markets are Aerospace, Chemical Processing, Medical, Oil and Gas, Power Generation, and Thermal Processing. Rolled Alloys Canada also operates in the pulp and paper, as well as mining, industries.

Rolled Alloys has expanded through acquisitions of other companies: Harvey Titanium, Weaver Steel, Super Alloys, SMS London, Clasma Trade, and RA® Materials (formerly Weir Materials and Foundry).

== History ==
Rolled Alloys was founded in 1953 on the introduction of wrought RA330 alloy as a replacement for cast HT alloy. Before 1953, Rolled Alloys was a subsidiary of MISCO (Michigan Steel Casting Company) and was not officially incorporated as a separate company until January 1953.

In 2012, Rolled Alloys expanded by opening a bar facility in Richburg, South Carolina. The company also constructed a new facility in Windsor, Connecticut.

In 2013, NeoNickel was formed, and is the exclusive representative of Rolled Alloys in Europe.

In 2024, the company opened a new high-tech bar processing facility in Tampa, Florida, specializing in stainless bar processing. Later in 2024, Rolled Alloys moved operations to a new 250,000-square-foot processing facility in Maumee, Ohio.

The company has a presence in 7 U.S. states, Canada, and China.

== Products and Processing ==
Rolled Alloys supplies nickel alloys, cobalt alloys, titanium, and stainless steels in various forms, including plate, sheet, bar, pipe, and fittings.

The company also markets proprietary alloy grades such as RA330, RA333, RA 602 CA, and RA 253 MA.

The company offers many processing capabilities such as laser cutting, waterjet cutting, precision bar saw, and more.
