= Leaded copper =

Metal alloy of copper with lead

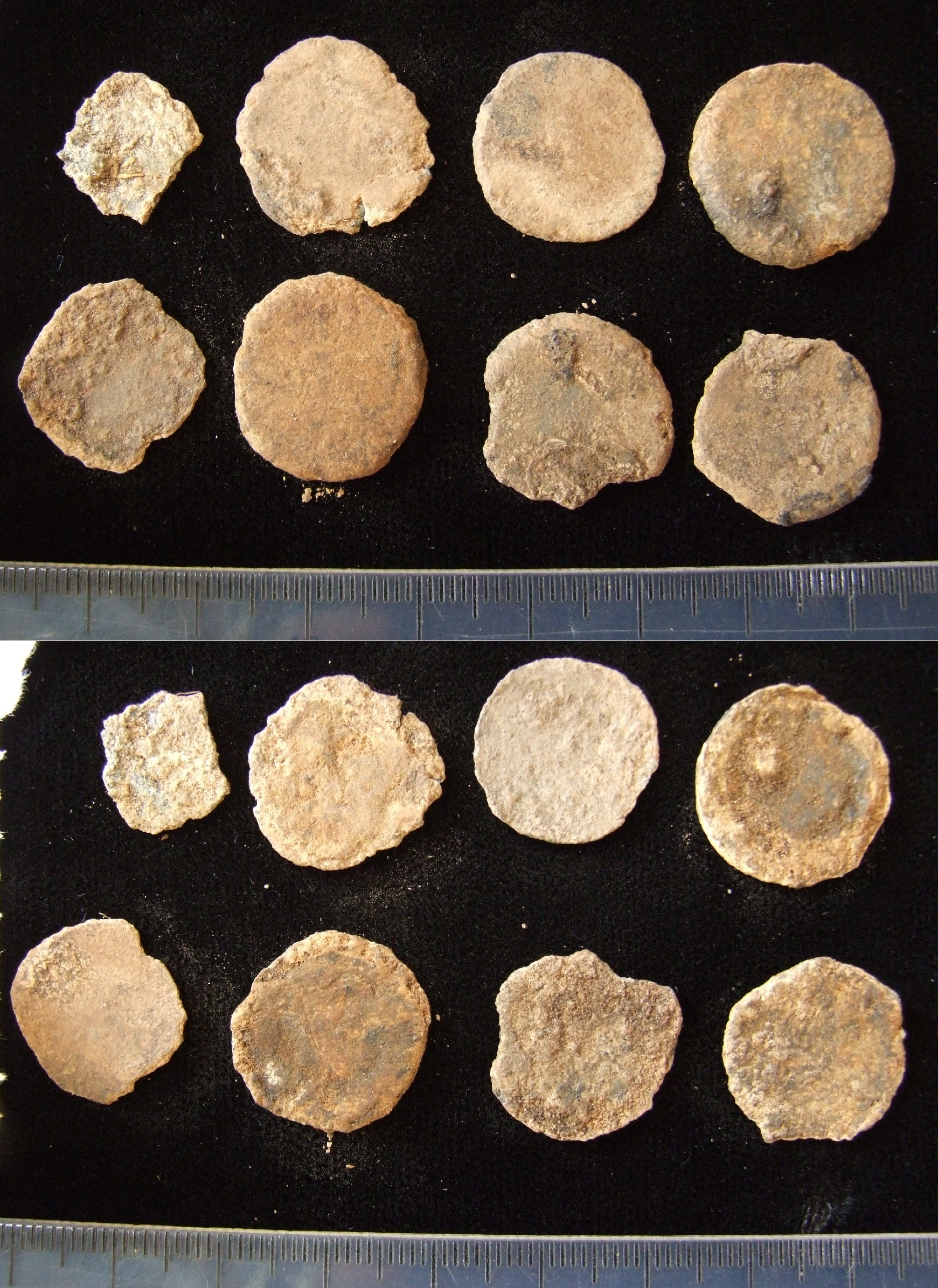
17th c. leaded copper tokens, found in Hatton, Lincolnshire; face & reverse

Leaded copper (Greek: μολυβδόχαλκος, molybdochalkos lit. 'lead-copper') is a metal alloy of copper with lead. A small amount of lead makes the copper easier to machine. Alloys with a larger amount of lead are used for bearings. Brass and bronze alloys of copper may have lead added and are then also sometimes referred to as leaded copper alloys. Leaded copper and its alloys have been used since ancient times.

== History ==
Signs of leaded copper use are found in the manufacture of ancient Egyptian faience. By 1500 BC leaded copper could be found across the Old World from East Asia to Africa and Europe.

Enigmatic entries in a Chinese manuscript, the Kao Gong Ji dating from around 300 BC, were deciphered by scholars in 2022, and seem to indicate that a pre-prepared copper-lead alloy named Jin(金) may have been used in the preparation of ancient bronzes. Another copper-tin-lead alloy named Xi(锡) was also tentatively identified as a pre-prepared component of Chinese bronzes. This part of the manuscript relates to an attempt to standardise the quality of bronze manufacture.

Leaded copper was frequently used in alchemy. Yellow-colored molybdochalkos was a starting material for transmutation into gold. In the tradition of Mary the Jewess, molybdochalkos was the typical base metal used in the kerotakis, wherein leaded copper was exposed to sulfur vapors and blackened, on the basis of nigredo.

== Applications ==
Leaded copper alloys are used to make electrical connectors and mechanical bearings, especially in the automotive industry where high performance and reliability are required. Mechanical bearings can have high lead content. Such high lead content alloys are unsuitable for welding or brazing.

=== Machined alloys ===
Alloys with around 2-4% lead are used for machined copper applications, where the lead content lubricates the copper and makes it easier to machine. These include high-quality electrical connectors where a high current capacity and low electrical resistance are required. Such connectors are used in industrial automation and the automotive industry. Brasses (copper alloyed with zinc) may also be leaded for the same reason.

=== Cast and sintered alloys ===
High-strength casting copper alloys typically contain less than 2% lead. Bearing alloys are often cast or sintered onto a steel backing. Softer alloys with a higher lead content are also used, for example in bushes where conformance to the opposite bearing surface is important.

Some casting alloys have over 20% lead content but, due to their toxicity, they are no longer used.

== Toxicity ==
When lead alloys wear, lead is released into the environment. It is a toxic heavy metal and in recent times the use of leaded copper alloys has been reduced.
