= Goloid =

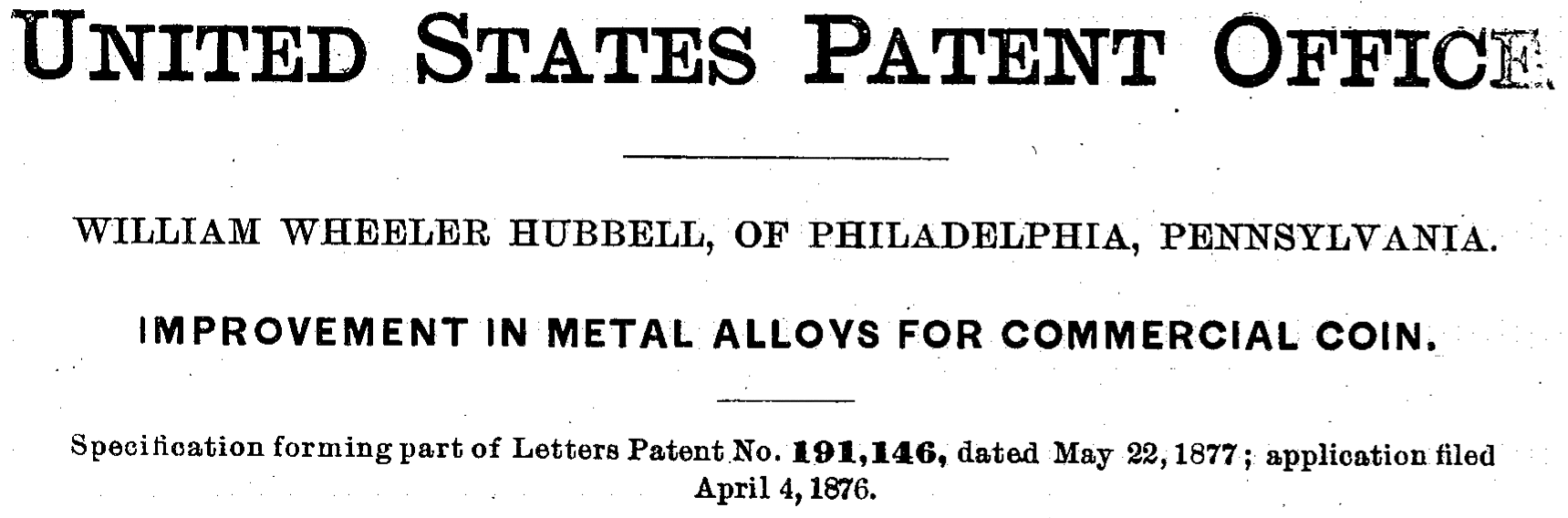
Header of U.S. Patent #191,146, "Improvement in Metal Alloys for Commercial Coin"

Goloid is an alloy of silver, gold and copper patented by Dr. William Wheeler Hubbell on May 22, 1877 (U.S. patent #191,146). The patent specifies 1 part gold (about 3.6%), 24 parts silver (about 87.3%), and 2.5 parts copper (about 9.1%, all by weight); however, the patent also states that "The proportions may be slightly varied" and goes on to specify that the silver portion can range from 20 times to 30 times that of the gold, and the copper could range from one-eighth to one-twelfth (from 12.5% to 8.33%) of the total mixture. The patent specifies that the metals be separately melted, then mixed, along with "sulphate of sodium or sulphate of potassium" in the amount of one part sulfate to one thousand parts metal. The alloy, in varying proportions (sometimes slightly out of these specifications), was used by the United States Mint to strike pattern dollars, sometimes called "metric dollars" (some were marked with "metric" in the coin design, while all had metal proportions and total coin weight as design features) from 1878 to 1880. Patterns of the same design were struck in other metals, including aluminum, copper, normal coin silver, lead, and white metal.

In the end, goloid was rejected as a coinage metal because it could not be distinguished from the normal U.S. 90% silver coin alloy without chemical analysis, thus inviting counterfeiters to use silver-copper alloys alone to make lower-value copies.
