= Pseudo palladium =

Experimental binary alloy

Pseudo palladium alloy

Pseudo palladium (RhAg) is a binary alloy consisting of equal parts of rhodium (atomic number 45) and silver (atomic number 47) created using nanotechnology to create a far more homogeneous mixture than might be possible using more conventional methods. This alloy exhibits properties of the intervening element palladium (atomic number 46).

== History ==
The production of this alloy was first reported by Kyoto University Professor Hiroshi Kitagawa and his research team, October 27, 2010. To make the new alloy, the Kyoto team used nanotechnology to "nebulise" the rhodium and silver and gradually mixed them with heated alcohol, with the two metals mixed stably at the atomic level. The same team also produced alternatives to other kinds of rare metals.

== Characteristics ==
The new alloy has similar properties to palladium, which is used as a catalyst to cleanse exhaust gas and absorbs large quantities of hydrogen.

Rhodium, palladium and silver have 45, 46, and 47 electrons, respectively, numbers that determine their chemical characterizations.

"The orbits of the electrons in the rhodium and silver atoms probably got jumbled up and formed the same orbits as those of palladium," Kitagawa said.

== Applications ==
The alloy has similar properties to palladium, which is used in cars' emission-reducing catalytic converters as well as in computers, mobile phones, flatscreen TVs, and dentistry instruments.

Hydrogen storage is cited as one potential use, however, according to researchers, the pseudo palladium alloy has only one half of palladium's hydrogen storage capacity.

== See also ==
- NaK
