= Titanium Beta C =

Titanium alloy

Titanium Beta C refers to Ti Beta-C, a trademark for an alloy of titanium originally filed by RTI International. It is a metastable "beta alloy" which was originally developed in the 1960s, Ti-3Al-8V-6Cr-4Mo-4Zr, nominally 3% aluminum, 8% vanadium, 6% chromium, 4% molybdenum, 4% zirconium, and balance (75%) titanium.

It is a heat-treatable, deep section hardenable, very high strength Titanium alloy possessing good toughness/strength properties, low elastic modulus and elevated resistance to stress and localized corrosion in high temperature sweet and sour brines.

== Properties ==
Beta C is relatively easy to melt and process during fabrication, when compared with other beta alloys. It is not recommended in high-wear applications due to its tendency to gall. Beta C has good corrosion resistance to both saline environments and acids, due to the properties of titanium and to its ability to spontaneously form a well adhered protective oxide layer when exposed to a high oxygen environment. Beta C is one of the least dense beta alloys, which combined with its ability to achieve high strengths through heat treatment provides a good strength to weight ratio. It is also capable of consistent high strength through relatively large section thicknesses.

== Applications ==
The properties of Beta C have led to its use in a number of niche applications, including parts of aircraft landing gear and in fasteners used in the automotive industry. Beta C is also used in oilfield applications such as pressure housings, shafts, valves and other critical components where very high strength and excellent corrosion resistance are required. It is approved for use in sour (H_{2}S) applications. It is approved to be certified to meet NACE MR0175 and ISO 15156 with a maximum hardness of HRC 42. It is available from the mill in forms: Ingot, Bloom, Bar, Billet, Seamless Pipe, and Wire.

== Composition ==
Beta C is composed primarily of titanium, with relatively large (3-8.5% each) additions of molybdenum, aluminium, zirconium, chromium and vanadium, and smaller amounts (0.3 - 0.005% each) of iron, hydrogen, nitrogen, oxygen, yttrium, carbon, and other elements.

== Designations ==
Other designations for Beta C include:

- Ti-3Al-8V-6Cr-4Mo-4Zr
- Ti-3-8-6-4-4
- ASTM Grade 19 and Grade 20 (with 0.05% Pd)
- AMS 4957
- AMS 4958
- AMS 4945
- MIL –T –9046 B3
- MIL –T –9047
- UNS R58640 (Grade 19)
- UNS R58645 (Grade 20)
