= Ti-6Al-4V =

Titanium alloy

Ti-6Al-4V (UNS designation R56400), also sometimes called TC4, Ti64, or ASTM Grade 5, is an alpha-beta titanium alloy with a high specific strength and excellent corrosion resistance. It is one of the most commonly used titanium alloys and is applied in a wide range of applications where high strength, low density, and excellent corrosion resistance are necessary, such as in aerospace and biomechanical implants and prostheses.

Backscattered electron micrograph of polished Ti-6Al-4V with an equiaxed microstructure. Dark grains are HCP alpha phase and light ones are BCC beta phase.

Studies of titanium alloys used in armor began in the 1950s at the Watertown Arsenal, which later became a part of the Army Research Laboratory.

A 1948 graduate of MIT, Stanley Abkowitz was a pioneer in the titanium industry and is credited for the invention of the Ti-6Al-4V during his time at the US Army’s Watertown Arsenal Laboratory in the early 1950s.

Titanium alloys are used in implanted medical devices due to their lower modulus, higher biocompatibility, and better corrosion resistance than stainless steels and cobalt-based alloys. These properties were a driving force for the early introduction of α (cp-Ti) and α+β (Ti-6Al-4V) alloys as well as for the more recent development of new Ti-alloy compositions and orthopaedic metastable b titanium alloys. The latter possess enhanced biocompatibility, a reduced elastic modulus, and superior strain-controlled and notch fatigue resistance. However, the poor shear strength and wear resistance of titanium alloys have limited their biomedical use. The wear resistance of b-Ti alloys has shown some improvement when compared to a#b alloys.

== Chemistry ==
(in wt. %)

	V	Al	Fe	O	C	N	H	Y	Ti	Remainder Each	Remainder Total
Min	3.5	5.5	--	--	--	--	--	--	--	--	--
Max	4.5	6.75	.3	.2	.08	.05	.015	.005	Balance	.1	.3

== Physical and mechanical properties ==
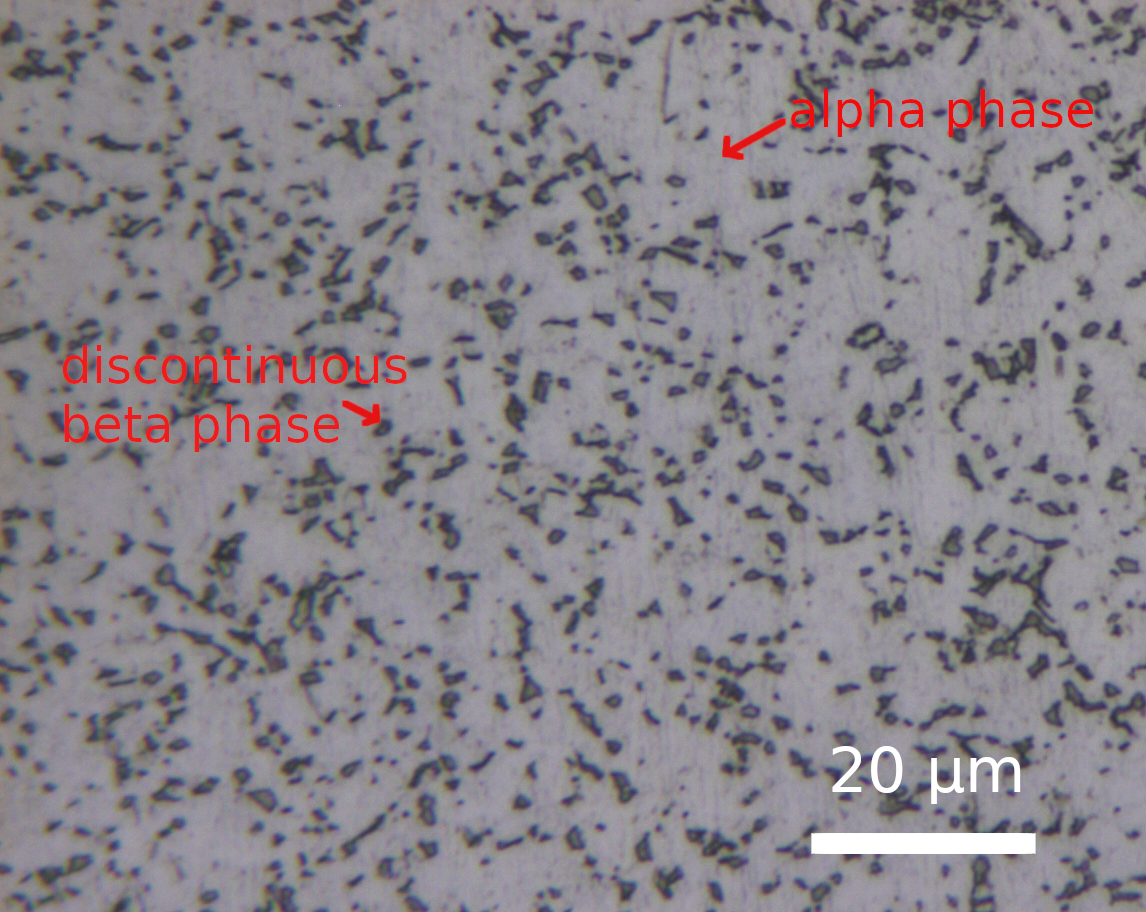
One possible microstructure of Ti-6Al-4V alloy with equiaxed alpha grains and discontinuous beta phase

Ti-6Al-4V titanium alloy commonly exists in alpha, with hcp crystal structure, (SG: P63/mmc) and beta, with bcc crystal structure, (SG: Im-3m) phases. While mechanical properties are a function of the heat treatment condition of the alloy and can vary based upon properties, typical property ranges for well-processed Ti-6Al-4V are shown below. Aluminum stabilizes the alpha phase, while vanadium stabilizes the beta phase.

	Density	Young's Modulus	Shear Modulus	Bulk Modulus	Poisson's Ratio	Tensile Yield Stress	Tensile Ultimate Stress	Hardness	Uniform Elongation
Min	4.429 g/cm^{3} (0.160 lb/cu in)	104 GPa (15.1×10^{6} psi)	40 GPa (5.8×10^{6} psi)	96.8 GPa (14.0×10^{6} psi)	0.31	880 MPa (128,000 psi)	900 MPa (130,000 psi)	36 Rockwell C (Typical)	5%
Max	4.512 g/cm^{3} (0.163 lb/cu in)	113 GPa (16.4×10^{6} psi)	45 GPa (6.5×10^{6} psi)	153 GPa (22.2×10^{6} psi)	0.37	920 MPa (133,000 psi)	950 MPa (138,000 psi)	--	18%

Ti-6Al-4V has a very low thermal conductivity at room temperature of 6.7 to 7.5 W/m·K, which contributes to its relatively poor machinability.

The alloy is vulnerable to cold dwell fatigue.

== Heat treatment of Ti-6Al-4V ==
Mill anneal, duplex anneal, and solution treatment and aging heat treatment processes for Ti-6Al-4V. Exact times and temperatures will vary by manufacturer.

Ti-6Al-4V is heat treated to vary the amounts and microstructure of α and β phases in the alloy. The microstructure will vary significantly depending on the exact heat treatment and method of processing. Three common heat treatment processes are mill annealing, duplex annealing, and solution treating and aging.

== Applications ==
- Aerospace structures. The Boeing 787 is 15% titanium by weight, and the Airbus A350 is 14%.
- Biomedical implants and prostheses.
- High-performance race cars.
- High-end bicycles.
- Additive manufacturing.
- Marine applications: Ti-6Al-4V Grade 5 is extensively used in marine applications due to its exceptional corrosion resistance in seawater environments. Ti-6Al-4V is applied in components exposed to marine atmospheres and underwater conditions, such as shipbuilding, offshore oil and gas platforms, and subsea equipment. Its resistance to corrosion helps in reducing maintenance costs and extending the lifespan of marine equipment.
- According to Apple, the 2025 iPhone Air's structural frame is made out of polished Grade 5 titanium.

== Specifications ==
- UNS: R56400
- AMS Standard: 4928
- ASTM Standard: F1472
- ASTM Standard: B265 Grade 5
