= Johannes de Malamanus =

Norman officer

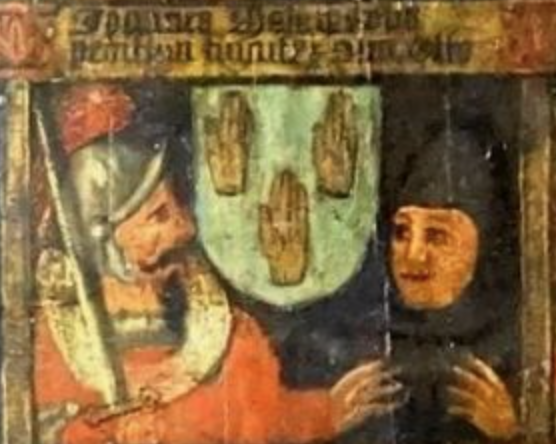
- Malamanus in Tabula Eliensis, 1596
- Born: Duchy of Normandy

Johannes de Malamanus was a Norman officer during the reign of William the Conqueror. He is primarily known for being one of the knights stationed at Ely in response to Hereward the Wake's insurrection, and for being the ostensible progenitor of the Milman family.

== Biography ==
Much of what is known of Johannes de Malamanus derives from Robert Orford's account of the Siege of Ely. According to Orford, once the Normans had broken through Hereward's defences in 1071, after several years of besiegement, the rebels implored the royal mercy. The leaders of the rebellion sought audience with the King at Warwick, "carrying rich treasures, the gift of atonement." William I consented, on the condition that forty royal officers be stationed at Ely, under the care of its monks, as he feared future revolt at the site while he was engaged in Scotland against Malcolm III.

Malamanus, an ensign of the foot, arrived with the other Norman knights and gentlemen, and was assigned a monk under whose stewardship he was to be kept; Otto the Benedictine. James Bentham writes that the Normans quartered at Ely "appear to have been Gentlemen of the best Families in the Kingdom, and Officers in the King's Army, sent down to be maintained at the charge of the Abby [sic], till he could otherwise provide for them, or that he had occasion for their immediate service." The cohort spent five years at the Abbey, dining with the monks in the Great Hall. The groups befriended one another by 1078, when William I sent the officers to quell his son Robert's insurrection in Normandy. According to Orford, the knights "departed with grief" and the monks "lamented their departure not only in tears, but in dismal howlings and exclamations, striking their breasts in despair." Otto and the monks accompanied Malamanus and his compatriots to 'Hadenham,' following in procession and hymn.

== Legacy ==
While there is no known account of Malamanus' life following his return to Normandy, William Miller points to him as the founder of the Milman family. This is reflected in Malamanus' personal Arms, painted in Ely's Great Hall by the monks after his departure, matching the Arms of the Milmans; Azure, 3 sinister gauntlets argent. Miller recounts the tradition of the appellation 'Malamanus,' or 'bad-hand,' being derived from Johannes' alleged left-handedness, "which appears likely as, as his arms are three sinister hands." By the time of Miller's writing the family were long established in Devon, Holderness and Chelsea.

Johannes de Malamanus is depicted on the 1596 Tabula Eliensis alongside Otto the Benedictine, in the section of the painting that portrays the "forty knights and gentlemen who were quartered with the monks of Ely during the reign of William the Conqueror."
