= Jason Haikara =

American businessman

Jason Zachary Haikara is an American businessman, marketer, and producer. He is a senior executive at 3C Ventures, a consultancy firm founded by Advertising Hall of Fame inductee Michael Kassan.

Previously, Haikara was an independent Senior Advisor and Event Producer for StoryTech, an experiential marketing company.

He served as a producer on two music videos, "Key in the Door" and "Surprise Me" and the upcoming short film "Wasp in the Wind Chime."

For over ten years, Haikara was an executive vice president at MediaLink, a consultancy firm founded by Kassan that provides strategic advisory to companies at the convergence of media, marketing, technology and entertainment. Prior to MediaLink, he was the co-president of Webby Award winning global digital entertainment studio Filmaka. Before Filmaka, Haikara was a senior marketing executive at Fox Broadcasting Company, and part of the team which launched The Simpsons, In Living Color, Beverly Hills, 90210, Melrose Place (1992), The X-Files, That '70s Show, Family Guy, 24, American Idol, House, and other television hits.

Haikara served three terms as co-chair of the Academy of Television Arts & Sciences Website Committee which oversees Emmys.com and five terms on its Interactive Media (now Emerging Media Programming) Peer Group Executive Committee. He previously served on its Brand and Marketing Committee. Haikara was the Executive Producer of the web series Apathy Apartments and the feature film The Middle of the Middle. In 2010, he was inducted into the International Academy of Web Television.

== Education ==
Jason Haikara was born and raised in St. Petersburg, Florida. After a one-year stint at Grahm Junior College in Boston, Massachusetts where he studied music engineering, Jason Haikara graduated with a B.A. in Speech Communication from the University of Miami, Coral Gables, Florida. At the University of Miami, Haikara was editor-in-chief of The Miami Hurricane student newspaper and a member of the student government entertainment committee.

== Fox Broadcasting ==
Haikara started his entertainment career at Fox Broadcasting Company, rising through the network's Affiliate Marketing, National Media, and On-Air Planning departments. In 2000, while managing the scheduling of network promotion inventory in primetime and sports, including the World Series and the Super Bowl, he was appointed to the Harvard School of Public Health's Mentoring Media Workgroup. In 2001, Haikara was named network's senior vice president of on-air promotion scheduling, a newly created position

In his final years at FOX, 2004–2007, Haikara became senior vice president, Internet marketing and national promotions and, then, senior vice president, marketing. Haikara directed all aspects of the network's online and digital presence, including marketing, creative, original content and distribution During his tenure overseeing digital marketing, The Simpsons.com won a 2005 Webby nomination for Best Television Website and Drive became the first series nominated for a Primetime Emmy Award under the Television Academy's new “broadband” eligibility guidelines for content which premiered on Fox.com. Haikara also managed cross-platform marketing campaigns which integrated network advertisers with primetime programs such as AOL and Ford's sponsorships of The O.C. and 24, respectively. In 2006, he was an Executive in Charge of Production of the Fox Fall Preview special.

== Filmaka ==
In October 2007, Haikara was invited by Filmaka's then president and former chairman of Fox Entertainment Group Sandy Grushow to launch the company, which had just ended a year-long beta phase. Haikara oversaw marketing, publicity, creative development and production for the studio whose global filmmaking community created television and web series, feature films as well as content for ad agencies, media companies and major brands such as Cisco, DIRECTV, FX Network, Red Bull, SABMiller and SNICKERS. Filmaka's branded entertainment creative was featured in Lincoln and Ford Mustang commercials during the CBS broadcast of the 2009 Grammy Awards and on NBC primetime, respectively.

In 2009, Filmaka's original web series The Ten Commandments of La Vida Loca won the Webby Award for Best Drama Series. Filmaka's first feature film was Swinging with the Finkels, written and directed by one of its community members Jonathan Newman, starring Martin Freeman and Mandy Moore.

== MediaLink ==
In October 2010, Sandy Grushow once again recruited Haikara to join Michael Kassan and him at MediaLink, named by Forbes as one of America's Best Management Consultancy Firms. While at MediaLink, Haikara led one of the company's top-performing departments and advised clients in various industries on brand, content, and distribution partnerships, marketing strategies, and best-in-class operational practices.
