= Daisy Beaumont =

English actress

- Born: Daisy Beaumont; 5 May 1973 (age 53); England, UK
- Occupation: Actress

Daisy Beaumont (born 5 May 1973) is an English actress.

== Career ==
Beaumont's television work includes a variety of shows, among others The Border, EastEnders, Hotel Babylon, A Touch of Cloth, Agatha Christie's Poirot, Mumbai Calling and The Bill as well as a small role in the Jackie Chan & Owen Wilson film Shanghai Knights.

In January 2013, she appeared in the ITV comedy drama series Great Night Out as Zoe, and in September 2013 she played the part of Stella Knight in the ITV drama Whitechapel.

In October 2014, she appeared in the eighth episode of the eighth series of the BBC sci-fi series Doctor Who, playing the role of Maisie Pitt in the story Mummy on the Orient Express.

== Filmography ==
=== Film ===
Year	Title	Role	Notes
1998	What Rats Won't Do	Girl on Boat	
1999	The World Is Not Enough	Nina	
2001	Summer Rain	Carly	
2002	Ten Minutes Older: The Cello	Nun	Segment: "Addicted to the Stars"
2002	Chasm	Jenny	Short film
2003	Shanghai Knights	Cigarette Girl	
2003	I'll Sleep When I'm Dead	Stella, Drugs Seeker	
2007	The Man Who Would Be Queen	Wendy	
2011	Swinging with the Finkels	Clementine	
2011	Foster	Sarah	
2016	Hank Zipzer's Christmas Catastrophe	Tammy	TV movie

=== Television ===
Year	Title	Role	Notes
1997	This Life	Gina	Episode: "Diet Hard"
1998	Touching Evil	Emily Hawkins	Episodes: "Scalping: Parts 1 & 2"
1998	Miracle at Midnight	Hannah Abrams	TV film
1998	Close Relations	Trish	TV miniseries
1998	Queen's Park Story	Cath	TV short
1998	The Bill	Lizzie Forbes	Episode: "Trial Run"
1999	Casualty	Robyn Nightingale	Episode: "White Lies, White Wedding"
1999	Where the Heart Is	Rachel	Episode: "Moving On"
2000	Agatha Christie's Poirot	Ursula Bourne	Episode: "The Murder of Roger Ackroyd"
2000	The Stretch	Laura Nichols	TV film
2000	EastEnders	Helen Graham	1 episode
2002	I Saw You	Student	Episode: "1.1"
2003	In Deep	Sue	Episodes: "Queen and Country: Parts 1 & 2"
2003	The Inspector Lynley Mysteries	Amanda	Episode: "Playing for the Ashes"
2003	Manchild	Surgeon	Episode: "2.5"
2003	The Bill	Sonia Graham	Episodes: "095", "096", "097"
2004	The Bill	DS Michelle Sanders	Episodes: "272", "273"
2004	Holby City	Rebecca Turner	Episode: "Time Waits for No Man"
2005	According to Bex	Miranda	Episode: "Private Dancer"
2005	Down to Earth	Helen	Episode: "Trouble 'n' Strife"
2006–2008	Star Stories	Various	Regular role (13 episodes)
2008	EastEnders	Selina Branning	Recurring role (8 episodes)
2008	Hotel Babylon	Nadine	Episode: "3.5"
2008	Mumbai Calling	Terri Johnson	(7 episodes)
2008–2009	The Border	Charlotte Bates	Recurring role (9 episodes)
2009	New Tricks	Sarah Chancellor	Episode: "Fresh Starts"
2010	The Armstrong and Miller Show	Various	Recurring role (6 episodes)
2011	Doctors	Jill Prudence	Episode: "Labyrinth"
2012	Very Important People	Amelia Backlash	Episode: "1.4"
2012	Just Around the Corner	Delia	TV film
2012	The Revolting World of Stanley Brown	Aunt Amy	Episode: "Wax"
2012–2013	A Touch of Cloth	Dr. Natasha Sachet	Episodes: "The First Case: Parts 1 & 2", "Undercover Cloth: Parts 1 & 2"
2013	Great Night Out	Zoe	Episodes: "1.2", "1.6"
2013	The Job Lot	Paula Evans	Episode: "1.6"
2013	Whitechapel	Stella Knight	Episodes: "4.1", "4.2"
2013	You, Me & Them	Debs Mason	(6 episodes)
2014	Blandings	Vanessa Polk	Episode: "Necessary Rhino"
2014	Lovesick	Vicar	Episode: "1.1"
2014	Doctor Who	Maisie	Episode: "Mummy on the Orient Express"
2016	The Coroner	Anna Daniels	Episode 2.7 "Perfect Pair"
