= Menlo College =

Private business college in Atherton, California, US

Coordinates: 37.455°N 122.193°W

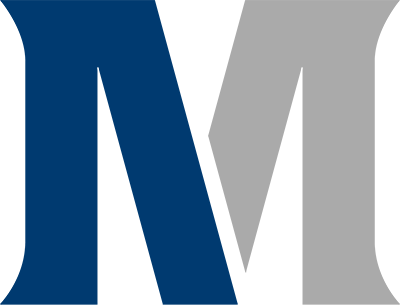
- Seal of Menlo College
- Former names: Menlo School and Junior College (1927–1949); Menlo School and Menlo College (1949–2008)
- Type: Private college
- Established: 1927 (99 years ago)
- Endowment: $24.6 million
- President: Steven A. Weiner
- Undergraduates: 825
- Location: Atherton, California, United States
- Campus: Suburban
- Colors: Navy Blue, Gray & White
- Nickname: Oaks
- Sporting affiliations: NCAA Division II – PacWest (primary); NCAA – MPSF (men's volleyball & wrestling)
- Website: menlo.edu

Menlo College is a private college specializing in business and located in Atherton, California, United States.

== Campus ==
Menlo College is situated on a 45-acre (0.18 km^{2}) campus in Atherton, California, 25 miles southeast of San Francisco and 20 miles northwest of San Jose, California.

== History ==
Menlo College was founded in 1927 when the Menlo School for Boys grew to include a junior college. The institution, under the leadership of Lowry Howard, changed its name to Menlo School and Junior College. The college admitted 27 students that year. Enrollment in the school and college rose to 112 the following year, with 80 of those students attending the college.

The effects of the 1929 stock market crash and subsequent depression reached Menlo in 1931, and the institution faced the possibility of having to close its doors. Deliverance came in the form of two generous acts. First, Board Chairman C. F. Michaels made a series of substantial loans to Menlo to help sustain its operations. That same year, the Town of Atherton voted to deed a strip of land to Menlo, allowing the institution to expand its campus. The property was originally the site for a proposed new road, but the town decided that the new road would not be necessary.

From the founding of the junior college through 1932, Howard and Michaels had been meeting with Ray Lyman Wilbur, president of Stanford University, to discuss the possibility of having Menlo serve as Stanford's lower division institution. The three developed a detailed plan wherein Stanford would drop its freshman and sophomore classes and Menlo would move its operations to the Stanford campus. The Stanford Board of Trustees reviewed the plans and turned down the proposal. Stanford would maintain its four-year undergraduate program. Wilbur remained interested in Menlo nonetheless, and in 1933, he appointed six members of the Stanford faculty to educational advisory roles at Menlo.

The start of World War II brought to Menlo the challenge of reduced enrollment. To balance the student body, Howard instated a four-four plan wherein grades 7 through 10 were designated to the school while grades 11 through 14 constituted the college.

As World War II was coming to an end in 1944, President Howard suffered severe heart trouble, and his physician advised that he retire from the presidency of Menlo. The Board of Trustees chose William E. Kratt, former college dean and soon-to-be Navy veteran, as Howard's successor.

The former estate of the Leon F. Douglass family, which was adjacent to Menlo, housed a rehabilitation center for World War II veterans until 1946. The Douglass family supported Menlo in acquiring the newly vacant property, and plans were made to move the school (grades 7 to 10, and later, 11 and 12) to that area.

The School of Business Administration (SBA) was established in 1949 as the college's first four-year program. This was a timely move, as Stanford had just dropped its undergraduate business courses to focus more on the Graduate School of Business. The institution again changed its name, this time to Menlo School and Menlo College.

The founding of the SBA made Menlo School and Menlo College eligible for complete tax exemption as a four-year, nonprofit educational institution. The savings in taxes were put into expanding and polishing Menlo. In 1953 the institution purchased property across the street from the campus to move the track and athletic fields to their current home.

1954 saw the development of two new dormitories for Menlo: Howard Hall and Michaels Hall, named after Lowry Howard and C. F. Michaels. In addition to student rooms, each building included four faculty apartments.

John D. Russell became the director of the college in 1955. An SBA professor and World War II veteran, Russell used his experience as a legal scholar to focus his courses on the legal aspects of business, earning him the affectionate nickname "Judge". He took deep interest in developing his students into business leaders and is considered by many to have epitomized the spirit of Menlo.

That same year, the Hewlett-Packard Company donated seven houses in Mountain View to Menlo. The houses were moved to the Douglass campus and assigned to faculty members.

In 1956 Florence Moore made a gift to Menlo in financing the construction of the Florence Moore Science and Engineering Building, housing math and science facilities as well as an auditorium.

Construction of a new student union, post office and dormitory was completed in 1958, and Menlo opened a new dining commons in 1962. The old dining commons was converted to the Bowman Library.

1969 brought to Menlo a new building for the School of Business Administration and the two-year school that included classrooms, faculty and staff offices, a theater and a computer center. This building, now called Brawner Hall, holds most of the business courses at Menlo. That same year, Menlo completed construction of its largest college dormitory, holding 150 students. President William E. Kratt retired in 1970, and in 1971 the dormitory was dedicated to him. William E. Kratt Hall currently serves as the primary housing facility for freshman students.

Richard F. O'Brien succeeded Kratt as President of Menlo. In the fall of 1971, Menlo became a co-educational institution and admitted its first female students.

The institution initiated its first major fund-raising campaign in 1976. The "Campaign for Menlo" set a $5 million goal to cover the costs of new athletic facilities, expand the library's collection, acquire new instructional equipment and increase the school's endowment.

James Waddell was the President of Menlo College from 1994 to 2004. Carlos López followed until 2007.

In 2007, Menlo College appointed G. Timothy Haight, former Dean of Business at California State University, Los Angeles, as its president.

In 2008, Menlo College and Menlo School finalized plans to become completely separate institutions. These plans included a land separation agreement. Under the agreement, the single parcel shared by the college and school was subdivided into two separate parcels. A third parcel, the Menlo Athletic Fields, is still jointly owned and managed by both.

Menlo College received its largest gift to date, a $21.3 million bequest from the Hope Bartnett Belloc Trust, in 2008. Belloc named Menlo as one of three beneficiaries of the total trust amount—around $60 million—in response to the college's mentorship of her son, Martin, during the 1962–63 academic year when he was a student. The other two recipients were United Cerebral Palsy North Bay in Petaluma, California and Radcliffe Institute for Advanced Study in Cambridge, Massachusetts.

U.S. News & World Report named Menlo College a "Best Regional College" in its 2014 edition of "America's Best Colleges." In 2014, Menlo College earned Association to Advance Collegiate Schools of Business (AACSB) accreditation, a distinction earned by less than five percent of the world's business schools.

In 2016, Menlo College inaugurated Steven A. Weiner as its 11th president.

In 2019, the Menlo Athletics Women's Wrestling team won two national titles - the first national titles to be won at the college.

In 2022, Menlo College opened a new 288-bed residence hall, Arrillaga Hall, named after John Arrillaga. It was the first new building on campus in nearly 45 years and was primarily funded by Arrillaga, along with contributions from several other donors.

Menlo College launched the Latino Leadership Program in 2025 to provide leadership development, mentorship, and community engagement opportunities for students.

== Academics ==
Menlo College offers bachelor's degrees in business and psychology, as well as master's degree programs including the Master of Science in Information Systems (MSIS), Master of Science in Financial Technology (MSFT), and Master of Arts in Sport and Performance Psychology (MASPP). Business programs include areas such as accounting, marketing, sports management, and AI & analytics.

=== Bowman Library ===
Bowman Library serves as a center for research, instruction, study, group work, and community events. The print collection includes more than 60,000 volumes, and the Library maintains subscriptions to 40,000 journals and magazines in print and online formats. The Library also provides on- and off-campus access to a variety of reference resources and databases in business and the liberal arts.

The library is named for Timothy Dillon Bowman, a former student. In 1962, Bowman's parents provided the funding necessary to convert the Menlo College Dining Commons into the present-day library (Curtis 1984, p. 28).

=== Rankings ===
The Princeton Review has recognized Menlo College as one of the “Best Colleges in the West” for over fifteen consecutive years, most recently in its 2025 Best Colleges: Region by Region list.

=== Accreditation ===
In 2014, Menlo College earned Association to Advance Collegiate Schools of Business (AACSB) accreditation. The college is also accredited by the WASC Senior College and University Commission.

== Athletics ==
The Menlo athletic teams are called the Oaks. The college is a member of NCAA Division II, primarily competing in the Pacific West Conference (PacWest) for most of its sports since the 2024–25 academic year; while its men's & women's wrestling and men's volleyball teams compete in the Mountain Pacific Sports Federation (MPSF). The Oaks previously competed as a member of the National Association of Intercollegiate Athletics (NAIA), primarily competing in the Golden State Athletic Conference (GSAC) from 2015–16 to 2023–24 and the California Pacific Conference (Cal Pac) from 1996–97 to 2014–15.

Menlo competes in 14 intercollegiate varsity sports: Men’s varsity sports include baseball, basketball, golf, soccer, tennis, volleyball, and wrestling. Women’s varsity sports include basketball, golf, soccer, softball, tennis, volleyball, and wrestling. In addition to its varsity teams, Menlo sponsors non-NCAA programs in NCBA baseball, NCWA men’s and women’s wrestling, men’s and women’s weightlifting, and men’s and women’s taekwondo. The taekwondo program is led by TJ Curry, a two-time U.S. national team member and international medalist, who serves as the college’s inaugural Director of Taekwondo.

In 2026, Menlo College announced the addition of a women's flag football program, which will begin competition in the 2026–2027 academic year as the college's 15th varsity sport.

=== Wrestling ===
The Menlo women's wrestling team became the first team to win a national championship for Menlo College in 2019, as well as earn its second title. On February 9, 2019, the team was crowned WCWA Women's Wrestling National Champion. Then, on March 6, 2019, the team claimed the NAIA Women's Wrestling National Invitational title.

=== Football ===
Originally a junior college program, the Menlo Oaks football team played at the four-year level from 1986 to 2014.

Three Menlo football players have played in the NFL: Burt Delavan, Nate Jackson, and Kaulana Park.

From 2006 to 2010, Menlo played in the Northwest Conference (NWC), an NCAA Division III athletic conference. From 2011 to 2014, Menlo was an NAIA independent school.

On February 1, 2015, the Menlo Board of Trustees voted to end the college's football program and cited financial viability issues as a major reason.

== Notable people ==
=== Alumni ===
- Al-Waleed bin Talal Al Saud, Saudi businessman, investor, philanthropist, and member of the Saudi royal family
- Faisal bin Abdullah Al Saud, former Saudi education minister (2009–2013)
- Mohammed bin Faisal Al Saud, Saudi businessman
- Danny Castillo, college wrestler and professional mixed martial artist
- Bruce Edwards, actor
- Josh Emmett, professional mixed martial artist
- James Espaldon, Guamanian politician
- Carla Esparza (née: O'Connell), professional mixed martial artist and repeat champion (2022)
- Ashlee Evans-Smith, professional mixed martial artist
- Steve Gonzalez, professional football player
- Dan Gurney, race car driver and builder
- Patty Hearst, newspaper heiress, socialite, actress, kidnap victim, and convicted bank robber
- Nate Jackson, professional football player
- Nathaniel Lepani, professional soccer player
- Penelope Ann Miller, actress
- John Pritzker, billionaire and investor and member of the Pritzker family
- John Senior founder of Heroes Welcome UK and first Territorial Army soldier deployed to Afghanistan
- Bob Shane and Nick Reynolds, members of the folk music group The Kingston Trio
- Kaylin Swart, soccer player
- Jeff van Gundy, professional basketball coach and analyst
- Fitria Yusuf, Indonesian socialite, businesswoman, model, and author
- Jigme Dorji Wangchuck, Gyaltshab of Bhutan since 2014, and a member of the Bhutanese royal family.

=== Faculty ===
- Melissa R. Michelson, Menlo College Dean of Arts and Sciences and Professor of Political Science
