= Processional hymn =

Christian hymn sung during a procession

Procession during an Evangelical-Lutheran Mass of the Societas Sanctae Birgittae in Vadstena Abbey Church, Sweden

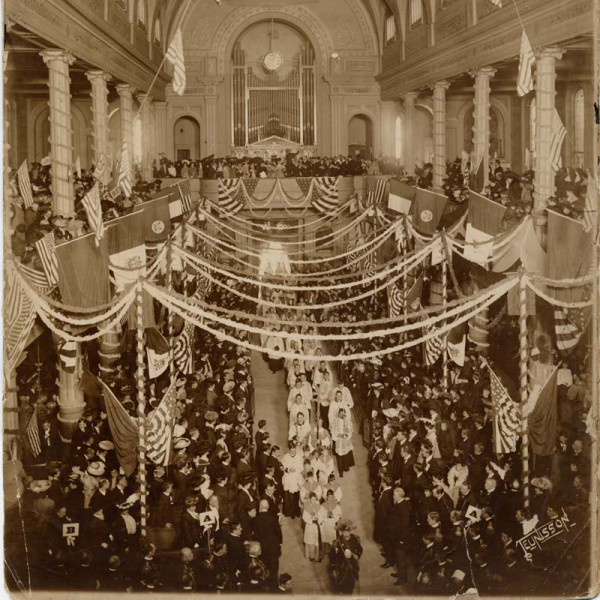
A Roman Catholic procession in St. Louis Cathedral before a Pontifical High Mass (1903).

A processional hymn, opening hymn, or gathering hymn is a chant, hymn or other music sung during the Procession, usually at the start of a Christian service, although occasionally during the service itself. The procession usually contains members of the clergy and the choir walking behind the processional cross. Occasionally, a service will also contain a recessional hymn recessional hymn (see below), although in the Baptist and Methodist traditions this is usually an organ voluntary.

The genre first appears in the early Middle Ages, and is a distinct genre from breviary hymns, often containing a refrain. With its longer cathedrals and churches, England was particularly rich in these and several are to be found in the Sarum Processional.

In The English Hymnal nos. 613 to 640 are described as "Processional" and nos. 641 to 646 are "Suitable for use in procession". The processional hymns include "Of the Father's Heart Begotten" (Corde natus ex parentis, by Prudentius), "Ride On, Ride On in Majesty!"(by H. H. Milman), "Hail thee, Festival Day!" (Salve, festa dies, by Venantius Fortunatus) and "Jerusalem, my happy home" (by F.B.P. c. 1580).

== Recessional hymn ==
A recessional hymn or closing hymn is a hymn placed at the end of a church service to close it. It is used commonly in the Catholic Church, the Evangelical-Lutheran Churches, Anglican Churches and Seventh-day Adventist Church, an equivalent to the concluding voluntary, which is called a Recessional Voluntary, for example a Wedding Recessional.

The recessional at the close of an Evangelical-Lutheran Mass at the Cathedral Church of Church of Saint Nicholas, Stockholm

Recessional at the conclusion of Mass on All Hallows' Eve in the Evangelical-Lutheran Hedvig Eleonora Church
