= Sir Derek Milman, 9th Baronet =

British Baronet (1918–1999)

Lieutenant Colonel Sir Derek Milman, 9th Baronet MC (1918–1999) was a British baronet, the ninth of the Milman baronets of Levaton-in-Woodland in the County of Devon.

== Biography ==
Born on 23 June 1918, the son of Brigadier Sir Lionel Milman, 7th Baronet CMG (1877-1962), Sir Derek Milman, 9th Baronet was educated at Bedford School and at the Royal Military College, Sandhurst. He was the ninth of the Milman baronets of Levaton-in-Woodland in the County of Devon, created on 28 November 1800 for Sir Francis Milman, 1st Baronet, Physician-in-Ordinary to King George III and President of the Royal College of Physicians, succeeding to the title upon the death of his brother, Sir Dermot Milman, 8th Baronet, on 13 January 1990. During the Second World War he served with the 2nd Punjab Regiment in Eritrea, North Africa and Burma and was awarded the Military Cross. He was succeeded by his nephew, Sir David Milman, 10th Baronet (born 1945).

Sir Derek Milman, 9th Baronet died on 12 May 1999.

Baronetage of Great Britain
Preceded by Dermot Milman	Baronet (of Levaton-in-Woodland); 1990–1999	Succeeded by David Milman
