= William Milman (lawyer) =

English barrister (1650–1713)

Sir William Milman
- Born: c. 1650; Westminster, London, England
- Died: 3 February 1713 (aged 62–63); Chelsea, London, England

Sir William Milman (c. 1650–1713) was an English barrister. Milman was knighted in 1705, having been introduced to Queen Anne by the Duke of Devon.

== Background ==
In The New Baronetage of England, Miller names Sir William Milman as a member of the Milman family of Levaton-in-Woodland, Devon, who, by 1804, "were long settled at Holderness, in Yorkshire, and at Chelsea, Middlesex." He claims the family to be descended from Johannes de Malamanus, a Norman officer sent by William the Conqueror to quell Hereward's 1070 rebellion on the Isle of Ely. Malamanus is included by Robert Orford in his list of Norman officers who participated in the siege of Ely Abbey, as an ensign of the foot. The appellation 'Malamanus,' or 'bad-hand,' is derived from Johannes' alleged left-handedness. This is the origin of the Milman coat of arms; three sinister gauntlets. Johannes de Malamanus is depicted on the 1596 Tabula Eliensis alongside Otto the Benedictine, in the section of the painting that portrays the "forty knights and gentlemen who were quartered with the monks of Ely during the reign of William the Conqueror."

Both William Miller, in The New Baronetage of England, and John Wilkes, in Encyclopaedia Londinensis, associate Sir William Milman with the Milman Baronets of Levaton-in-Woodland. It is not stated how the Chelsea, Devon, and Holderness branches of the family are connected, but the inheritance of Sir William's private chapel by the Milman Baronets is indicative of the link.

== Biography ==
Born in London, William Milman was baptised at St Martin-in-the-Fields on 9 January, 1650. His parents were William Milman and Mary Palmer. According to Le Neve's Pedigree of Knights, William Milman the elder worked as a shoemaker at the New Exchange in the Strand, but failed in business and later ran a coffeehouse.

Milman made his fortune in stock-jobbing. For most of his life, he was a barrister with the London Inns. Such was his prolificacy in his field, he became acquainted with William Cavendish, nominally duke of the Milmans' native county. Cavendish introduced Milman to Queen Anne, and Milman was knighted on 7 February, 1705, at St James's Palace.

Sir William Milman was married three times in his life. His first wife was Elizabeth Taylor, daughter of Col. Silvanus Taylor, and niece of Silas Taylor. William and Elizabeth had two children, both of whom died in infancy. One of their children, Ann Milman, was born in 1677. William later married Laetitia Masters, widow of Samuel Masters, preacher at Bridewell Hospital, and daughter of William Durham, rector of St Mildred, Bread Street. The couple bore no children, and Laetitia was buried at St Mildred's on 2 November, 1702. Milman's third and final wife was Elizabeth Vaughan, daughter of Mr. Vaughan of Wales. The couple also bore no children.

Sir William died on 3 February, 1713. He left no issue, and his fortune of £20,000 was left chiefly to his nieces; daughters of his brother John Milman, who "lived a poor man to whom his brother [Sir William] would not exhibit." His nieces, Elizabeth, Robella, Mary, and Diana, were bequeathed quarter-shares of Sir William's estate, on the condition they and their heirs retained the surname Milman. He was also survived by his mother, Mary Milman, and widow, Dame Elizabeth Milman, née Vaughan. His mother was left the house she lived in, and an annuity of £100 per year. His widow, Lady Elizabeth, was executrix of his will and was left an annuity of £600 per year, as long as she remained unmarried after the death of Sir William.

Milman was buried at More's Chapel, Chelsea. The chapel, originally the private property of Sir Thomas More, came into the ownership of Sir William Milman on his acquisition of Gorges House. His tombstone, inscribed with his arms, reads: "Here Lyeth The Body of Sr WILLIAM MILMAN Kr Barister at Law of the Inner Temple LONDON who Died at his House in CHELSEA Febry ye 3d in the 64th Year of his Age Annoque Dom 1713."

== Legacy ==
Following his death, Sir William Milman was remembered in the name of Milman House, his former estate. Originally Gorges House, the estate belonged to Sir Arthur Gorges, and was purchased by Sir William from dancing-master Josias Priest. Milman likely mortgaged the property from Priest between 1697 and 1706, before taking ownership by 1711. After Sir William's death, Milman House passed to his four nieces. By 1726 the property had been demolished, and his remaining nieces leased the land for the construction of "a new row of buildings intended to be called Milman's Row." Milman's Street remains testament to Sir William Milman's involvement in the area today.

Outside of Chelsea, Millman Street near Lamb's Conduit Street also bears lasting witness to Milman's London land ownership and development. The houses of this row were built upon the "three parcels of ground in Lambs Conduit Fields, St Andrews Holborn, Middlesex", on the Rugby Estate, whose lease Milman had taken over from Nicholas Barbon in 1702. In addition to the above, Milman is also known to have owned "a brick house on the north side of Great Marlborough Street".

A key source of information on the life of Sir William Milman is Le Neve's Pedigree of Knights, written by Peter Le Neve. The author gained his account of Milman from a Mr. Mynheer of Staple Inn, an "attorney who was his old acquaintance and fellow clerk with him." Mynheer was scathing in his appraisal of Milman, calling him "no gentleman" and "a worthless person by the general character of him." Le Neve finishes by quoting the assassins of Maximinus I and his children; "canis pessimi ne catulum esse relinquendum," that no child be left alive to a heretic parent.

== Arms ==
"Arms: Azure, 3 sinister gauntlets argent (Milman), impaling sable, a cheveron between 3 boys' heads with adders about their necks (Vaughan)."

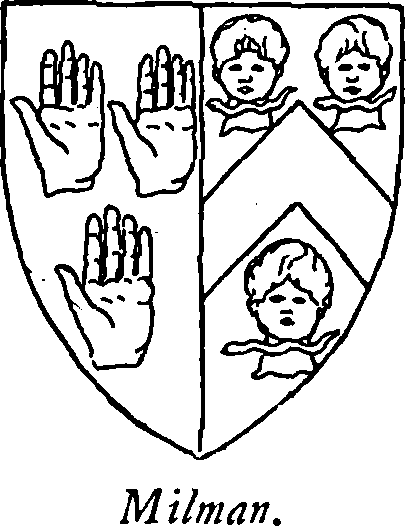
