= Bilton Grange =

Private school in Dunchurch, Warwickshire, England

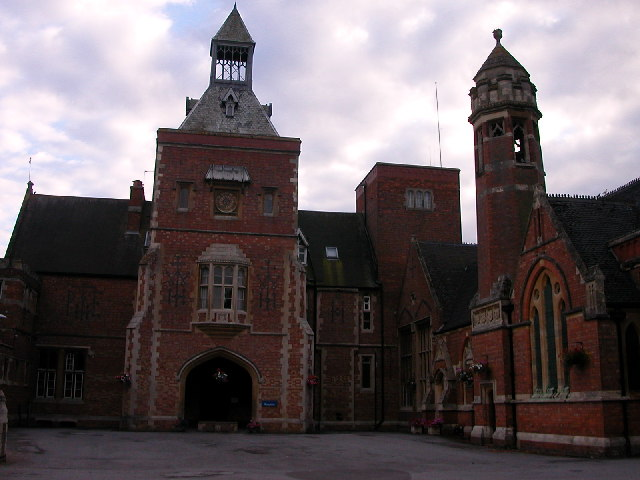

Location
- Dunchurch, Warwickshire, CV22 6QU; England
- Coordinates: 52°20′24″N 1°16′48″W

Information
- Type: Private preparatory day and boarding
- Motto: Iron Sharpenth Iron
- Religious affiliation: Church of England
- Established: 1873
- Founder: Rev. Walter Earle
- Chairman of Governors: Barry O'Brien
- Head: G Jones
- Executive Head Master: Peter Green
- Staff: 100
- Gender: Co-educational
- Age: 4 to 13
- Enrolment: 310
- Houses: 8: 4 senior, 4 junior
- Colours: Navy blue and red
- Former pupils: Old Biltonians
- Website: www.biltongrange.co.uk

Listed Building – Grade II*
- Official name: Bilton Grange School and attached chapel and terrace
- Designated: 2 August 1984
- Reference no.: 1034932

National Register of Historic Parks and Gardens
- Official name: Bilton Grange
- Type: Grade II
- Designated: 14 December 1997
- Reference no.: 1001378

Bilton Grange is a preparatory school located in Dunchurch, near Rugby, Warwickshire. The present headmaster is Gareth Jones.

The mansion which forms the main school was built in 1846 attached to an existing farmhouse and was a private family home. It was designed by the eminent designer and architect Augustus Welby Pugin for Captain Washington Hibbert, and is a Grade II* listed building. The first pupils were brought to the house by The Reverend Walter Earle in 1887. The brewhouse was converted into the school chapel in 1889 and classrooms were added in 1892.

The school formally amalgamated with the neighbouring Homefield Girls' School, with which it had long had a connection, in 1992 with Bilton Grange becoming co-educational and the Homefield School building becoming the Pre-Prep department for children aged 4 to 8.

Bilton Grange has always been a boarding school but in more recent times has accommodated an increasing number of day children, many of whom take advantage of the opportunity to flexi board and become weekly or full boarders during their time at Bilton Grange.

The school enjoys an estate of over 90 acres including several areas of woodland and a 9-hole golf course laid out in 1998. The designed the library and a staircase leading to the boarding house.

The four Sections (Bilton's name for houses) are Cheadle, Westminster, Alton and Oxburgh.

Bilton Grange is commonly recognised as the feeder to Rugby School although over half of each leaving yeargroup of 13-year-olds go on to other public schools such as Uppingham School, Eton College and Oundle School. In September 2019 the school announced that it was merging with Rugby School as one charity, but remaining a separate, autonomous school, with children still able to progress to a range of public schools.

== Notable former pupils ==
- Arthur Bliss, composer
- Henry Segrave, racing driver and holder of world land and water speed records
- Taio Cruz, singer/songwriter
- E J Dent, Cambridge professor of music
- Thomas Dunlop, cricketer
- Rupert Evans, actor
- Sir Ernest Gowers, civil servant and author of Plain Words
- Miles Kington, jazz musician and writer
- Sir Dermot Milman, 8th Baronet, rugby union international and first-class cricketer
- John Senior MBE TD Dr(Hc), founder of Heroes Welcome UK
- Sir Nicholas Winterton, MP
