= St Hilda's Anglican School for Girls =

Independent school in Mosman Park, Western Australia

Location
- Mosman Park, Perth, Western Australia; Australia; 32°00′18″S 115°46′05″E

Information
- Type: Independent single-sex and co-educational early learning, primary, and secondary day and boarding school
- Motto: Latin: Domine Dirige Nos (Lord Direct Us)
- Denomination: Anglican
- Patron saint: Saint Hilda of Whitby
- Established: 1896; 130 years ago
- Sister school: Christ Church Grammar School (Brother school); Hangzhou Foreign Language School
- Educational authority: WA Department of Education
- Chairman: Joanna Millard
- Principal: Fiona Johnston
- Chaplain: Father Philip Schonken
- Years: Early learning; JK–12
- Gender: Girls only (K–12); Co-educational (Early learning)
- Enrolment: ~1,200+ (2020)
- Houses: De Grey, Blackwood, Fitzroy, Gascoyne
- Colours: Blue, yellow, and grey
- Slogan: Sparking Extraordinary Futures
- Athletics: Independent Girls Schools Sports Association
- Affiliations: Alliance of Girls' Schools Australasia; Junior School Heads Association of Australia; Association of Heads of Independent Schools of Australia; Australian Boarding Schools' Association
- Website: www.sthildas.wa.edu.au

St Hilda's Anglican School for Girls is an Australian independent non-selective Anglican single-sex primary and secondary day and boarding school for girls, located in Mosman Park, a western suburb of Perth, Western Australia. In addition, the school provides co-educational early learning education to both girls and boys.

== History ==
Established in Claremont in 1896 when Miss Ross took in girls to her house in Claremont. It was called the Claremont Ladies' College and Kindergarten when it was bought by Melina Florence Parnell in 1904.

In 1930 it was taken over by the Church of England and re-established in 1931 at Mosman Park.

In 1938 the school employed Jeana Bradley to teach Biology, history and economics and while at the school she led St Hilda's Dramatic Scociety. Her productions in 1942 of Macbeth, Five Birds in a Cage, and The Rehearsal led to her being invited by Professor Allan Edwards to lecture at the University of Western Australia.

== Today ==
The school catered for approximately 1,200 students from Early Learning, through Junior Kindergarten to Year 12, including up to 120 boarders in Years 7 to 12 in 2026.

St Hilda's is affiliated with the Association of Heads of Independent Schools of Australia (AHISA), the Junior School Heads Association of Australia (JSHAA), the Australian Boarding Schools' Association (ABSA), the Alliance of Girls' Schools Australasia (AGSA), and is a member of the Independent Girls' Schools Sports Association (IGSSA).

St Hilda's brother school is Christ Church Grammar School located in Claremont.

== Notable alumni ==
- Adelaide Kane, actress
- Jessica Marais, actress
- Gina Rinehart, mining magnate, billionaire businesswoman.
- Fitria Yusuf, socialite, fashion model and writer
- Diana Warnock, journalist, broadcaster, author and state politician.

== Sister and brother schools ==
St Hilda's has a sister and brother school partnership with the following schools:

- Christ Church Grammar School
- Hangzhou Foreign Language School

== See also ==
- Anglican education in Australia
- List of schools in the Perth metropolitan area
- List of boarding schools in Australia
