= Samuel Masters =

17th-century English preacher

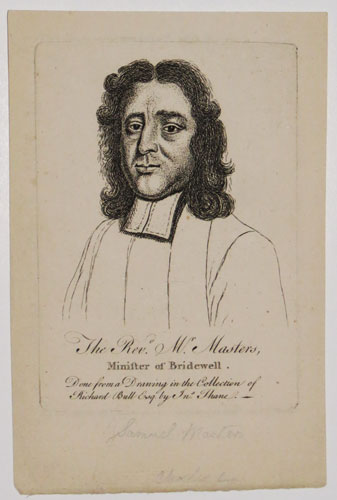
- Masters, sketched c. 1750
- Born: c. 1646; Salisbury, Wiltshire, England
- Died: 12 September 1693 (aged 46–47); Bath, Somerset, England

Samuel Masters (1646–1693) was an English Anglican cleric. He was a proponent of the Williamite cause during the Glorious Revolution of 1688, and a preacher at Bridewell Hospital.

== Biography ==
Born in Salisbury, Samuel Masters was the son of George and Abigail Masters. He was baptised at St Edmund's Church in Salisbury on 20 September 1646.

A student of Oxford University, Masters was enrolled at Wadham College at the age of 16, and was later a fellow of Exeter College. He obtained an MA, and was afterwards admitted a Bachelor of Divinity. While studying, Samuel Masters was a preacher at Stanton Harcourt and South Leigh, both in Oxfordshire. He was later made presbyter of St Paul's and Lichfield, and personal chaplain to the Earl of Radnor.

On 12 January 1676, Masters was appointed minister to Bridewell Hospital, to "preach twice every Sunday and to perform other duties incident to the minister's place." With an annual salary of £80 4d 4p, Masters occupied the position until his death in 1693, when he was replaced by Francis Atterbury. Samuel Masters was incumbent minister at Bridewell during the Glorious Revolution. In this period Masters, while moderate as a cleric, was an outspoken supporter of King William III's new regime, and published several works defending his leadership. In The Case of Allegiance in Our Present Circumstances (1689), Masters recounted that with the rule of James II he had lived under "a slavish fear" and that he had "almost lost [his] liberty of thinking freely."

Samuel Masters died on the 12 September 1693, in Bath. He had been in the city for some time in an effort to recover his health. He was buried on the 13th of September at Bath Abbey. Masters was survived by his four children and his wife, Laetitia Masters, née Durham, who later married Sir William Milman.
