= Foster (film) =

2011 television film directed by Jonathan Newman

- UK DVD cover
- Directed by: Jonathan Newman
- Written by: Jonathan Newman
- Produced by: Roger Birnbaum; Gary Barber; Steven Spielberg
- Starring: Toni Collette; Ioan Gruffudd; Maurice Cole; Hayley Mills; Richard E. Grant; Anne Reid; Daisy Beaumont
- Cinematography: Dirk Nel
- Edited by: Eddie Hamilton
- Music by: Mark Thomas
- Production companies: Reliance Big Pictures; Kintop Pictures; Serendipity Films; Starlight Film Partners; Bent Nail Productions
- Distributed by: SC Films International
- Release dates: October 18, 2011 (Rome Film Festival); June 2, 2012 (Los Angeles); June 6, 2012 (United States)
- Running time: 91 minutes
- Country: United States
- Language: English

Foster is a 2011 British comedy-drama film written and directed by Jonathan Newman, based on his 2005 short film. Part of it was shot at Legoland Windsor in April 2010. The film stars Golden Globe winner Toni Collette, Ioan Gruffudd, Richard E. Grant, BAFTA Award winner Hayley Mills and Maurice Cole.

== Plot ==
Zooey and Alec Morrison are a married couple struggling to conceive. A medical examination determines that Zooey's infertility is psychosomatic, caused by the trauma and guilt of losing their son Samuel to being hit by a car while she was walking with him two years ago. As an alternative, the couple visits Mrs. Lang's foster home, who after interviewing them emphasizes that adoption is usually a long process.

Unexpectedly, one of the children that Zooey saluted at the orphanage, Eli, appears in their home the next day claiming that they made such a favorable impression that the adoption process was expedited, as evidenced by the paperwork he brings. Back at the foster home, they are attended by Lang's employee, Jane, who explains that Mrs. Lang has been hospitalized. Although not entirely certain, she sees no problem with the couple taking Eli with them. Despite being 7 years old, Eli is an exceptionally responsible and helpful boy, precociously knowledgeable and skillful in a wide variety of matters such as cooking, etiquette and economics. Distinctively, Eli also wears a suit every day.

While shopping for more casual clothes for Eli, Zooey learns that Alec has mortgaged their home. Alec explains that his father's toy company has been experiencing financial difficulties ever since he took the lead after his passing, but this enrages Zooey even more. Aware of the tension between them, Eli arranges several activities to rekindle their relationship, concluding with a surprise visit to Legoland in order to fulfill Alec's childhood dream and provide inspiration for his job. The trip proves to be enjoyable for the three, reconciling the couple, and they buy toy driving licenses as a souvenir. Unknown to the couple, Eli is a close friend of Mr. Potts, a homeless man from a nearby park who regularly makes an appearance to guide the couple through hardship.

One day, while Eli is playing the piano, Zooey and Alec gather the courage to talk to him about Samuel. They allow him to enter his bedroom and then visit his grave. Despite it happening years ago, Eli and Mr. Potts realize that the couple is still unable to move on. Later at night, Alec and Mr. Potts meet at the park. Watching the fireflies, Mr. Potts advises him to embrace the present, in order to build a more exciting future.

Inspired by Eli playing with his Matryoshka doll and with the boy's help, Alec presents a toy called "The Mystery Box" to a consumer committee. Eli explains that the box contains five unknown toys for the price of three. Although skeptical at first, soon the entire committee is interested and the product is a success, solving their financial issues and relaunching Alec's company.

On Christmas Eve, Mr. Potts is invited to dinner with the family and is allowed to groom himself before he departs again. That night, Zooey gives a positive pregnancy test as a gift to Alec. On Christmas morning, the overjoyed couple is calling Eli from downstairs to wake him up. Alec goes to his room, only to find a letter. Meanwhile, Zooey receives a call from Jane, who explains that there are no records of any child named Eli ever residing in their foster home. Zooey's shock only grows larger upon discovering that Eli's photos in both the adoption documents and Legoland driver's license are inexplicably blank.

Experiencing a great loss again, they open the letter. Eli expresses his gratitude for his time with them and asks them not to worry about his whereabouts. He also encourages them to focus on the future while remembering the joy that Samuel brought them, instead of his death, of which he reassures Zooey that it was never her fault. Zooey gives birth to a girl and Samuel's room is reformed for her. Eli goes to another home, all while being watched by Mr. Potts, Mrs. Lang and Jane, implied to be angels as well.

== Cast ==
- Toni Collette as Zooey Morrison
- Ioan Gruffudd as Alec Morrison
- Maurice Cole as Eli
- Hayley Mills as Mrs. Lange
- Richard E. Grant as Mr. Potts
- Anne Reid as Diane
- Daisy Beaumont as Sarah
- Bobby Smalldridge as Samuel
- Tim Beckman as Jim
- Jo Wyatt as Jane
- Haruka Kuroda as the translator in the consumer committee

== Production ==
Foster, the short film, premiered on HBO and BBC in 2007. It won Best Film, Best Actor (for Preston Nyman), Special Jury Prize and Best Screenplay at the Braga International Film Festival in Portugal. The film garnered Newman a nomination for BBC Three's New Filmmaker Award. It was also nominated for Best Film at the Rhode Island Film Festival in 2006.

After the success of the short, Peter Farrelly of the Farrelly brothers became interested in the development of a feature-length film though the film was ultimately produced by Bend it Like Beckham producer Deepak Nayar. Shooting subsequently began in the spring of 2010 for six weeks on location in London.

== Release ==
The film premiered on October 18, 2011 at the Rome Film Festival.

== Critical reception ==
The film was met with positive reviews, with Italian film review site Persinsala calling it a "sweet and very moving comedy with a happy ending" and praising Cole's performance, "caught in the shoes of a child – incredibly mature for his age".
