= George Milman =

English cricketer (1830–1898)

Personal information
- Full name: George Alderson Milman
- Born: 11 October 1830; Westminster, Middlesex, England
- Died: 29 December 1898 (aged 68); Heavitree, Devon, England
- Batting: Right-handed
- Bowling: Right-arm medium
- Relatives: Sir Lionel Milman (nephew); Sir Dermot Milman (great-nephew)

Domestic team information
- Years: Team
- 1868–1869: Marylebone Cricket Club

Career statistics
Competition	First-class
Matches	3
Runs scored	48
Batting average	9.60
100s/50s	–/–
Top score	31
Balls bowled	360
Wickets	15
Bowling average	9.60
5 wickets in innings	2
10 wickets in match	1
Best bowling	7/65
Catches/stumpings	2/–
- Source: Cricinfo, 2 September 2021

George Alderson Milman (11 October 1830 – 29 December 1898) was an English first-class cricketer.

The son of Sir William George Milman, he was born at Westminster in October 1830. Milman graduated from the Royal Military Academy, Woolwich in December 1848 as a second lieutenant into the Royal Artillery, before being promoted to first lieutenant in January 1849. Milman served with the Royal Artillery in the Crimean War and was present at the Siege of Sevastopol. He was promoted to second captain in May 1856. Following the war, Milman was decorated by the Ottoman Empire with the Order of the Medjidie, 5th Class in March 1858.

He first played first-class cricket for the Gentlemen of Marylebone Cricket Club against the Gentlemen of Kent at the Canterbury Cricket Week of 1863, with success, with Milman taking figures of 5 for 45 and 7 for 65 in the match with his right-arm medium pace bowling. He later made a further two first-class appearances, this time for the Marylebone Cricket Club against Cambridge University in 1868 and 1869. In the Royal Artillery, Milman was made a captain in charge of a company of gentlemen cadets in July 1867. Having held the brevet ranks of captain and major, he was made a brevet lieutenant colonel in January 1868, before gaining the rank in full in December 1873. He was placed on the retired list in July 1881. Milman died at Heavitree in December 1898. His nephew was Sir Lionel Milman, while his great–nephew was Sir Dermot Milman, 8th Baronet.
