= Melina Florence Parnell =

Teacher and school proprietor (1870–1944)

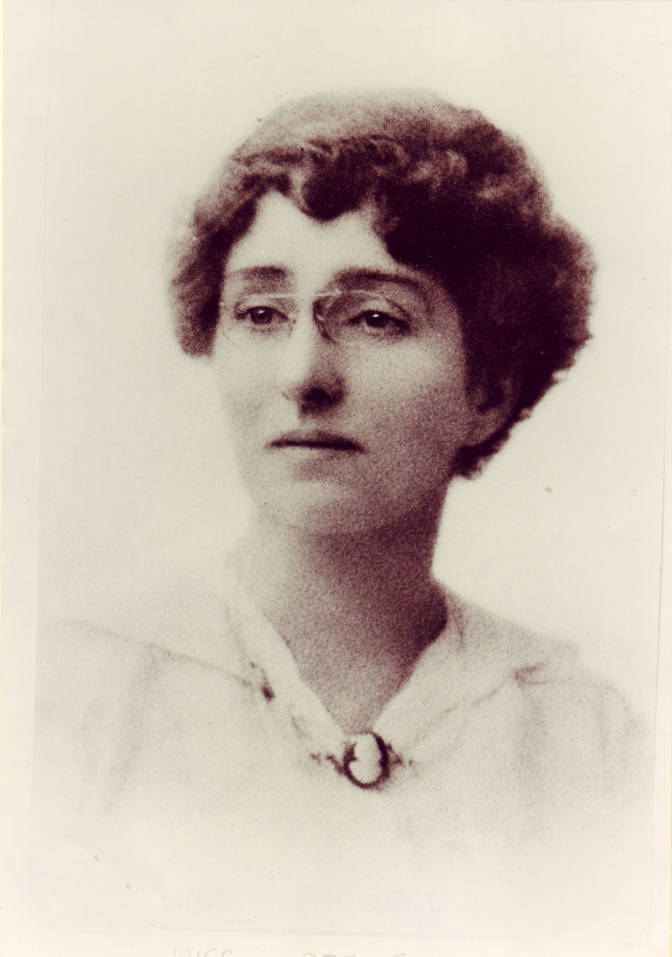
- in 1905
- Born: 2 July 1870; Bow in London
- Died: 30 August 1944 (aged 74); West Leederville

Melina Florence Parnell (2 July 1870 – 30 August 1944) was an Australian teacher who owned and developed what became St Hilda's Anglican School for Girls in Perth.

== Life ==
Parnell was born in Bow in London in 1870. Her parents were Melina Sarah (born Blake) and Frederick Charles Parnell. Her father made watches and she had five siblings. Her education was limited by her father who did not want educated daughters and he would not support any aspiration to go to university. Her only qualifications were in music as her uncle paid for her music lessons as the Guildhall School of Music. She was skilled at music, singing and painting.

In 1887 it was realised that one of her siblings might benefit from living in Australia and the family emigrated. She worked and taught in Australia. In 1897 she returned from England to work for the influential Amy Jane Best. Amy Best employed six staff at her Central High School for Girls which was known as "Miss Bests" and she believed in equal pay and votes for women. Parnell bought her own school in 1904. This was the time of the gold rush and several new schools opened and Miss Best's closed in 1907. Parnell had bought the Claremont Ladies' College and Kindergarten (aka Miss Allen's School) which she renamed the Girls' High School. Her school had no uniform initially and she wanted a classless school that delivered a rigorous education. However she knew that many of the parents did not expect their daughters to have a career as they would be (well educated) wives. One of her pupils, Carol Coombe, went on to an acting career in Hollywood.

Parnell retired in 1926 selling the school to the Church of England. The school moved in 1930 and became the St Hilda's Anglican School for Girls. Parnell died in West Leederville in 1944.
