= Fitria Yusuf =

Indonesian socialite and fashion model (born 1982)

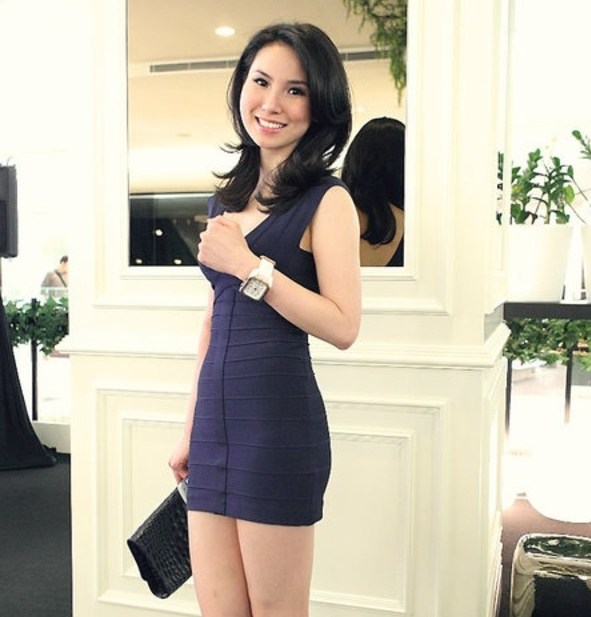
- Born: Fitria Yusuf H December 9, 1982 (age 43); Jakarta, Indonesia
- Other names: Fifi; Fitria Jusuf; Fitria Yusuf Khalid Hamka
- Education: GS Fame Institute of Business (2006); Menlo College (2001)
- Spouse: Wakid Khalid (m. 2020)
- Parents: Jusuf Hamka; Lena Burhanudin
- Relatives: Feisal Hamka (Brother); Farid Hamka (Brother); Joshua Suhaimi (Nephew)
- Modeling information
- Height: 167 cm (5 ft 6 in)
- Hair color: Dark brown
- Eye color: Dark brown
- Website: fitriayusuf.com

Fitria "Fifi" Yusuf (born 9 December 1982) is an Indonesian socialite, fashion model and writer.

== Life and career ==
Yusuf was born in Jakarta, Indonesia on December 9, 1982. She moved to Australia as a child and attended St Hilda's Anglican School for Girls in Perth. She graduated from Menlo College in 2001 with a bachelor's degree in business administration, majoring in marketing from GS Fame Institute of Business in Jakarta. She has worked as an editor for a number of fashion magazines in Jakarta, as well as a columnist of Eve magazine, before opening her own one-stop shopping boutique called Ivy boutique in 2006. She co-founded Twinkle-Twinkle in 2009, a company producing customized crystal casings for smartphones. She married Wakid Khalid, an actor of Iranian descent, in 2020, and converted to Islam.

=== Writings ===
In 2009, Fitria Yusuf co-authored Little Pink Book: Jakarta Style & Shopping Guide with her friend Alexandra Dewi. In 2011, Yusuf co-authored another fashion-themed book called Hermes Temptation. The 400-page book tells the story of a million-dollar resell business of French luxury-bags brand Hermès which became "a must-have item" among the high society in Jakarta. The book became a national best-seller and was printed in Indonesia and in the United States.

=== Corporate career ===
In 2009, Yusuf was appointed as a commissioner of PT Mitra International Resources TBL, a mining services company; she worked there until 2011. From 2012 to 2013, she was editor in chief of Aesthetic Beauty Guide Indonesia and chief executive officer of PT Fifefa International Jakarta from 2011 onwards. In 2014, she joined property and food & beverage business, Ozone Hotel & Eatery, in Pantai Indah Kapuk, North Jakarta. She became vice president director of PT Citra Marga Nusaphala Persada Tbk. (CMNP) in October 2015. Previously, she was independent commissioner at the toll road construction management company. She is involved in a CSR program carried out by CMNP and efforts to regulate tolls, as well as the provision of green open space.

== Awards and recognition ==
Yusuf was in her youth and twenties recognized by various media and company as a fashion icon including Tatler magazine, Senayan City, Kuningan City, Johnny Andrean Salon, and HighEnd magazine.
