= The Adventurer: The Curse of the Midas Box =

- Theatrical release poster
- Directed by: Jonathan Newman
- Screenplay by: Christian Taylor; Matthew Huffman
- Based on: Mariah Mundi by G. P. Taylor
- Produced by: Peter Bevan; Ibon Cormenzana; Ignasi Estapé; Karl Richards
- Starring: Michael Sheen; Sam Neill; Lena Headey; Ioan Gruffudd; Keeley Hawes; Tristan Gemmill; Aneurin Barnard
- Cinematography: Unax Mendía
- Edited by: David Gallart; Bernat Vilaplana
- Music by: Fernando Velázquez
- Release date: January 10, 2014
- Running time: 98 minutes
- Countries: United Kingdom; Spain; Belgium
- Language: English
- Box office: $128,471

The Adventurer: The Curse of the Midas Box is a 2014 fantasy adventure film directed by Jonathan Newman and starring Aneurin Barnard as the protagonist, Mariah Mundi. It also stars Michael Sheen, Sam Neill, Lena Headey, Ioan Gruffudd, Keeley Hawes, and Tristan Gemmill. It was written by Christian Taylor and Matthew Huffman, and is based on the novel Mariah Mundi by G. P. Taylor.

== Plot ==
The Bureau of Antiquities are a secret government organization which protect the world from the misuse of dangerous historical artifacts. Captain Will Charity, a daring and unsinkable agent of the Bureau, catches up with Otto Luger, a wealthy and ambitious opponent. Luger has found the map revealing the location of the Midas box, an item lost in time, which is said to transform anything placed inside it to pure gold. Charity appears as Luger betrays and silences his henchmen. Although separated by the detonation of Luger's dynamite, both men escape, but Charity managed to palm a lapis amulet from Luger before the explosion.

Charity afterwards turns up at the British museum, and interrupts the lecture of an old friend, Charles Mundi, by collapsing of a knife wound. Knowing he may be close to capture, he entrusts the two halves of the amulet to Catherine, Charles's wife, warning her to keep them out of the wrong hands before disappearing out the window. Catherine in turn passes the two halves on to her sons, Mariah and Felix, while saying goodbye to them, along with the enigmatic saying: "Faithfulness will be your shield, though a thousand may fall and hide, but no evil shall ever come near you with gold at your side".

Charles and Catherine are kidnapped by Luger immediately, and Mariah, suspecting something ominous, flees onto the streets with Felix. Deducing that Catherine gave the amulet to her sons, Luger sends his men after the boys. Felix is captured, along with his amulet, but Charity comes to the rescue of a distraught Mariah. Charity promises to track down his protege's parents but sends Mariah to work undercover as a porter at the Prince Regent Hotel. Charity believes that the Midas box, as well as Felix, is hidden near the hotel, hence Luger's ownership of the establishment.

Upon landing on Prince Regent Island, Mariah is alarmed to discover that all children under twelve have vanished, apparently "snatched by the beast" as the frightened townsfolk put it. At the hotel, Mariah meets Sacha, an Irish maid, whose reluctance to form a friendship stems from trouble with her widowed father at home. Mariah enlists her help to search for clues, and the pair discover an ancient catacomb in the foundation, where they find the skeletal remains of Charles Pinworth, the hotel's original owner, murdered by Luger.

Appalled by the danger of the situation, Sacha storms off. Mariah makes the acquaintance of the Great Bismillah, an eccentric Transylvanian illusionist, whose show astounds even the skeptical Luger. Mariah reconciles with Sacha, and the two uncover Luger's secret office, where they find a journal with a horrific revelation: the Midas box does not create gold. It is a weapon with the power of life and death.

Afterwards, Mariah is pounced upon by Luger's henchwoman Monica Black, who is suspicious of the porter's activities in the hotel. When she finds his half of the amulet, she gloatingly deduces his identity, only to be knocked unconscious by Bismillah, who proves to be none other than Charity in disguise.

Charity confesses that his efforts to find Mariah's parents came to nothing because of evidence that they had been disposed of by Luger. Mariah braves the forest where the beast is said to hunt, only to discover that the beast is a drilling machine, and the rumored ghosts are the slave children Luger has digging for the box. Mariah's reunion with Felix is cut short, and he returns to the hotel, where he locates the entrance of the mine.

Mariah frees Felix, but his fragment of the amulet begins glowing, leading them to the true hiding place of the Midas box. Luger follows them, with Sacha hostage, and orders them to retrieve the box. The brothers obey but accidentally spring a trap which seals Felix in a rapidly flooding chamber. Sacha's father sacrifices himself to help his daughter rescue the slave children from Monica, while Mariah pursues Luger, who is ambushed by the Bureau, but turns the tables by activating the Midas box with the amulet and begins disintegrating anyone who stands in his path.

Mariah realizes that his mother's saying refers to the ability of gold to absorb the power of the box, puts on a suit of ceremonial gold armor from Luger's collection, and gives chase with the drilling machine. Together with Charity, he fights Luger as the machine rolls toward a precipice. Before dying from a blast of the box's energy, Luger reveals that Mariah's parents are still alive, and Mariah frees Felix from the flooding chamber.

Afterwards, Sacha, Felix, and Mariah receive medals of valor from the Bureau, with the promise that they may work for them again. Mariah and Sacha confess their feelings and decide to stay together. Charity leaves to search for the boys' parents, who are still missing. He promises to return for Mariah.

A mid-credits scene reveals that Catherine, their mother, has been taken to Egypt by the villain Gormenberg—who turns out to be Charles himself, gloating over how many plans he has for the future.

== Cast ==
- Michael Sheen as Captain Will Charity: The character Captain Jack Charity (as it appears in the original G. P. Taylor novel) is reported to be partly inspired by the restaurant-owning adventurer and founder of Heroes Welcome UK, Major (Ret) John Senior MBE TD DL.
- Sam Neill as Otto Luger: The primary antagonist, who is as brutal as he is ambitious. Captain Charity initially cites him as the man who has made it his mission to acquire "some of the most powerful and dangerous artifacts in the world", implying that he is in charge of the conspiracy to locate the Midas box and exploit its power. Later, however, Charity and Black reveal that Gormenberg was somehow the man behind Luger. In the original novel, Luger hails from Texas, and owns the hotel. At the climax, he is revealed to be Gormenberg, who stole the identity of the real Luger and hid the body in the cellar (a role relegated to Charles Pinworth in the film).
- Lena Headey as Monica
- Mella Carron as Sacha
- Ioan Gruffudd as Charles Mundi/Gormenberg: Mariah's father, who turns out to be Gormenberg, and is implied to be a greater adversary to the Bureau than Luger. In the original novel, Mariah's parents are deceased before the events of the story, and Gormenberg is a master of disguise who impersonates multiple characters to hide his identity (including Luger and Charity). Given Gormenberg's talent for deception, it is unclear whether Charles Mundi is simply one of his aliases, or whether he stole Charles's identity at some point.
- Keeley Hawes as Catherine Mundi
- Aneurin Barnard as Mariah Mundi
- Tristan Gemmill as Isambard Black
- Daniel Wilde as Cleavy
- Xavier Atkins as Felix Mundi
- Vincenzo Pellegrino as Grendel
- Oliver Stark as Glocky
- Ian Reddington as Ratchit
- Ross O'Hennessy as Team Member
- Paul Lavers as Mr Dunne
- Brian Nickels as Grimm

== Production ==
The first in what was intended to be a film franchise, the film was produced by London- and Los Angeles-based production company Entertainment Motion Pictures.

Filming took place in sound stages and locations throughout the South West of England including St Michael's Mount, Bristol, Bath, Charlestown Harbour, Kidderminster Town railway station, and Lacock Abbey.

== Reception ==
On the review aggregator website Rotten Tomatoes, 20% of 15 critics' reviews are positive, with an average rating of 5/10. Metacritic, which uses a weighted average, assigned the film a score of 39 out of 100, based on 8 critics, indicating "generally unfavorable" reviews.

Dennis Harvey of Variety found the film, 'formulaic' and summed it up as 'an OK time-filler for undiscriminating younger audiences, providing some hope that future developments might yield greater payoffs'. IndieWire deemed the film 'dull', citing poor writing, but praising Headey. The Hollywood Reporter praised the production values, but saw it as a 'stillborn attempt' to start a film franchise.

In contrast, Slant Magazine found it had charming storybook qualities.
