= Ride On, Ride On in Majesty! =

Christian hymn written by Henry Hart Milman

- by Henry Hart Milman
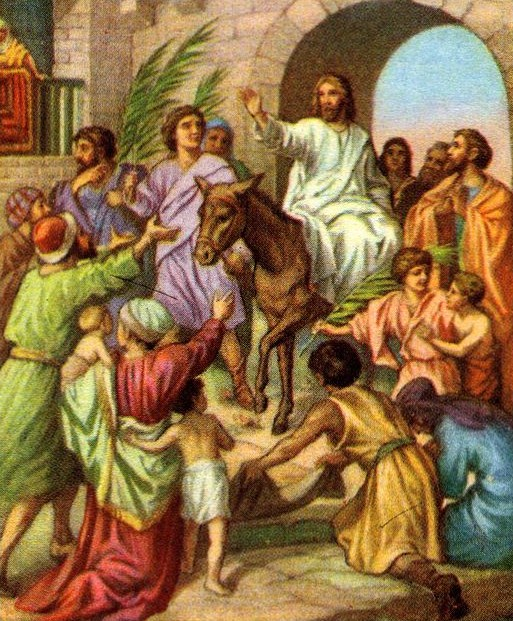
- Jesus entering Jerusalem (the biblical narrative on which the hymn is based), early 19th century
- Genre: Hymn
- Occasion: Palm Sunday
- Written: 1827
- Based on: Matthew 21:1-17
- Meter: 8.8.8.8 (L.M.)
- Melody: "St. Drostane"; "Winchester New"

"Ride On, Ride On in Majesty!", also titled "Ride On! Ride On in Majesty", is a Christian hymn written by Henry Hart Milman in 1820. It is a Palm Sunday hymn and refers to Matthew 21:1–17 and Jesus' triumphal entry into Jerusalem.

== History ==
While Milman wrote "Ride On, Ride On in Majesty!" in 1820, it was not published in a hymn book until 1827 when it was published in Bishop Reginald Heber's Hymns Written and Adapted to the Weekly Church Service of the Year. This is reported to only have happened after Milman met Heber in 1823 before Heber became Bishop of Calcutta. It was described by composer Stanley L. Osbourne as "Objective, robust, confident, and stirring, it possesses that peculiar combination of tragedy and victory which draws the singer into the very centre of the drama. It is this which gives the hymn its power and its challenge". The hymn proved popular: in 1907, John Julian, in his Dictionary of Hymnology, stated it was the most popular Palm Sunday hymn in the English language at that time.

The hymn is viewed to be full of dramatic irony. The third line of the first verse "Thine humble beast pursues his road" has been disliked by some hymn book editors. In 1852 it was changed to "O Saviour meek, pursue Thy road" and in 1855 to "With joyous throngs pursue Thy road". Some hymn books have omitted the first verse. The unaltered original text, however appears in later collections such as the 1906 English Hymnal, and in some modern hymnals.

The hymn is used as a processional hymn during Palm Sunday.

== Tune ==
The hymn is sung to a variety of tunes—the database at Hymnary.org shows 39 tunes paired with it—including St Drostane by John Bacchus Dykes, and Winchester New. The last of these is frequently employed in the United Kingdom. It first appears in Musikalisches Handbuch der geistlichen Melodien (Hamburg, 1690), and was reworked into a long-meter setting by William Henry Havergal in an 1864 publication, Old Church Psalmody. Named after the county seat of Hampshire, it is appended with "new" to distinguish it from Winchester Old, which is most commonly sung as the Christmas hymn "While shepherds watched their flocks by night".
