= Peter Bevan =

British film producer

Peter Bevan is a British film producer based in Los Angeles, whose previous producing credits include The Adventurer: The Curse of the Midas Box, Jackboots on Whitehall, Eichmann, Dread, Book of Blood, The Last Harbor, 14 Days with Victor, and The Expatriate. Peter is also co-founder and co-CEO of the film production company Entertainment Motion Pictures.
