= Sir Francis Milman, 1st Baronet =

English physician

Sir Francis Milman, 1st Baronet (31 August 1746 – 24 June 1821) was an English physician.

He was born the son of Francis Milman, rector of East Ogwell, Devon and educated at Exeter College, Oxford, where he was awarded B.A. in 1764, M.A. in 1767, M.B. in 1770, and M.D. in 1776. In 1765 he was elected to a college fellowship and in 1771 awarded a Radcliffe travelling fellowship.

He was appointed physician to the Middlesex Hospital (1777–1779), and a fellow of the College of Physicians of London in 1778. He established a practice in London and in 1785 was made physician extraordinary to the king's household, becoming physician in ordinary to the king in 1806.

At the College of Physicians he delivered the Gulstonian lectures on scurvy in 1780, was five times censor between 1779 and 1799, delivered the Croonian lectures in 1781, and the Harveian oration in 1782. He was elected president in 1811 and 1812 but resigned in 1813. In 1800 he was created a baronet.

He died at Pinner Grove, Middlesex in 1821, and was buried in the church of St. Luke at Chelsea. He had married Frances, the daughter of William Hart of Stapleton, Gloucestershire. His eldest son, William George, succeeded him in the baronetcy, and was father of Robert Milman, Bishop of Calcutta. His youngest son, Henry Hart Milman became Dean of St Paul's.

Baronetage of Great Britain
New creation	Baronet (of Levaton-in-Woodland); 1800–1821	Succeeded by William Milman
