= John Senior =

British Army officer (born 1960)

- John Senior MBE TD DL attending The Buckingham Palace Garden Party June 2011
- Born: John Wilson Senior; 1960 (age 65–66); Scarborough, England
- Military career
- Allegiance: United Kingdom
- Branch: Territorial Army
- Service years: 1979–2006
- Rank: Major
- Units: 2 Bn Yorkshire Volunteers, 4/5 Green Howards, 16 UK Air Assault Brigade(HQ), Kabul Multi National Brigade (KMNB)
- Conflicts: Operation Fingal
- Awards: Member of the Most Excellent Order of the British Empire (MBE), Territorial Decoration (TD), Doctor of the University of Hull (Honoris Causa)

Major John Wilson Senior, MBE, TD, DL, mobilised on 27 December 2001, Senior was the first member of the British Territorial Army to be deployed on operational service to Afghanistan (post 11 September 2001). He is also the founder of Heroes Welcome UK, a national scheme to encourage local communities to show their open support to British and other UK-based military personnel.

== Personal life ==
Senior was born in 1960 in Scarborough, North Yorkshire and educated at Bilton Grange, Millfield and Menlo College, San Francisco.

In 1963 the Senior family survived the Lakonia disaster, on the evening of 22 December, the Greek cruise liner TSMS Lakonia (formerly the Johan Van Oldenbarnevelt ‘JVO’) caught fire and was abandoned in mid Atlantic (later sinking under tow to Gibraltar), of the 1022 souls on board, 95 passengers and 33 crew members lost their lives, many due to the swamping of the ship's life boats. At the subsequent Board of Inquiry the Lakonia's seaworthiness and the behaviour of the Captain and crew were severely criticised, leading to criminal charges being brought. As a result of the disaster a thorough review of maritime safety law was undertaken leading to significant changes in the rules allowing ships to sail from port, if deemed unfit for sea.

During his Millfield school career, Senior was better known for challenging authority rather than academic achievement, a rugby player and horseman, Senior was more often found on the polo, hunting and sports fields rather than in the classroom. In June 1977 the Daily Mail reported on the scandal of a streaking incident at Millfield School, Somerset. Senior and a group of friends had been intercepted by elements of the local constabulary whilst streaking back to their boarding house after a late night visit to a local pub. Senior was caught and arrested holding down a barbed wire fence whilst in a state of undress, his compatriots successfully escaped but were later identified when they reported to the Matron's office requiring first aid to lacerations of their abdomen and upper thigh areas. The incident led to Senior and one other pupil being expelled.

In 1980 Senior returned home from University in California, and went to work at the family’s restaurant business (posh fish and chips since 1883), taking an interest in the development of Scarborough’s tourism industry, he co-founded a number of tourism groups including the South Bay Traders Association and Forum for Tourism. A keen mountain walker and climber Senior was an active member and Chairman of the Scarborough and Ryedale Mountain Rescue Team. In 2003 he was selected as a Prospective Parliamentary Candidate for the Conservative Party, a career path not yet pursued. Senior is credited with launching Free Bay one of the first free public Wifi zones in Britain and was cosignatory to Scarborough’s urban renaissance programme the success of which helped win the town the title of most Enterprising Place in Europe 2010. Senior married his wife Nicola in 1984 at the Gibraltar Registry Office and they have a daughter Harriet, the family continue to operate their Scarborough based restaurant and property business sharing time between homes in North Yorkshire, London and Southern Spain, where Senior indulges his love of painting. In 2013 Senior was appointed to the post of Lifeboat Operations Manager, (LOM) RNLI at the Scarborough Station and in 2022 Senior accepted the honorary title of Lifeboat Station President. In Jan 2016 Her Majesty the Queen appointed Senior a Member of the Most Excellent Order of the British Empire MBE for services to the British Armed Forces and the Borough of Scarborough and later the same year, the Vice Chancellor of the University of Hull Professor Calie Pistorius conferred Senior with the honour of becoming a Doctor of the University (Honoris Causa). Earlier in 2016 Senior was invited to be a contributor to John Sentamu Archbishop of York's latest book, Agape Love Stories which was launched at St Michaels De BelfryChurch, York on 1 December 2016. The book contains a series of 22 contributions, including John Vavier and Richard Taylor father to Damilola Taylor the stories illustrate personal sacrifice and love in terms of there relationship to the Christian faith. Senior's contribution reflects on the ideal of being prepared to lay one's life down for one's friend, in the context of being a member of an RNLI Lifeboat crew. Senior uses the tragic Andrew McGeown incident of Feb 2015 to illustrate the bravery, courage and potential for personal sacrifice of all those involved. On 31 October 2024 Senior was appointed a Deputy Lieutenant for the County of North Yorkshire by the Monarch’s representative, the Lord Lieutenant of North Yorkshire, Mrs Johanna Ropner.

== Military career ==
Senior joined the Territorial Army in 1979 and was granted a Queen's Commission in 1988, serving with 2nd Battalion Yorkshire Volunteers, Queen's Own Yeomanry, 4/5 Battalion the Green Howards and 16 Air Assault Brigade HQ. Mobilised for Operation Fingal on 26 December 2001, Major Senior was the first Territorial Army Soldier to be deployed into the Afghanistan theatre of operations and served with the Kabul Multi National Brigade, ISAF Commanded by Brigadier Barney White-Spunner. (present conflict). Awarded the Territorial Decoration (T.D) in 2006. Following his return from Afghanistan, Senior raised £20,000 for Project Gecko an educational charity working to provide and improve basic school facilities for Afghan children.

== Heroes Welcome UK ==
In March 2008 Senior inadvertently founded the Heroes Welcome UK community initiative when he placed a hand-drawn poster stating "Heroes Welcome Here" in the window of the Golden Grid Fish Restaurant. The scheme which is designed to encourage a demonstration of support for members of the Armed Forces is an open resource and completely free to join. Since inception it has developed into a national network of Heroes Welcome Towns and Cities where a special warm welcome is offered to members of the Armed Forces. Hampshire was the first Heroes Welcome County, joining at a ceremony hosted by the Chairman of the Council Cllr Anna Mc'Nair Scott in the Great Hall of Winchester Castle on Armistice Day 2011, North Yorkshire County Council joined the scheme in January 2012, followed by the Falkland Islands in May 2012 and the Rock of Gibraltar in January 2013. 2014 saw the launch of Heroes Welcome in London supported by the LTDA and London Black cabs and also the first dual Welsh / English language Heroes Welcome scheme by Caerphilly County Borough, other scheme launches have followed, including Barnsley Metropolitan Council, Farnley Tyas and Kirklees District Council. Heroes Welcome UK is administered from offices based in Scarborough.

== Mariah Mundi and the Midas Box ==
(Adventurer, Curse of the Midas Box) It is reported that the best-selling author, G. P. Taylor based the fictional character Captain Jack Charity an adventuring retired army officer and owner of the Golden Kipper Fish Restaurant on his friend Senior. An Anglo Spanish consortium including E Motion and Arcadia Motion Pictures produced a film version of Taylor's first book in the series, Mariah Mundi and the Midas Box, in 2014. The Welsh actor Michael Sheen OBE is cast as Charity and set against Sam Neill's Otto Luger, the villain of the piece.

== Honours and awards ==
Member of the Most Excellent Order of the British Empire (Post-Nominal Letters shown as: MBE)

Territorial Decoration (Post-nominal letters shown as: TD)

Operational Service Medal for Afghanistan

Queen Elizabeth II Golden Jubilee Medal 2002

Afghanistan service (Non-Article 5)

Queen Elizabeth II Diamond Jubilee Medal 2012
