= Jeana Bradley =

Australian university lecturer and theatre producer

Jeanna Bradley
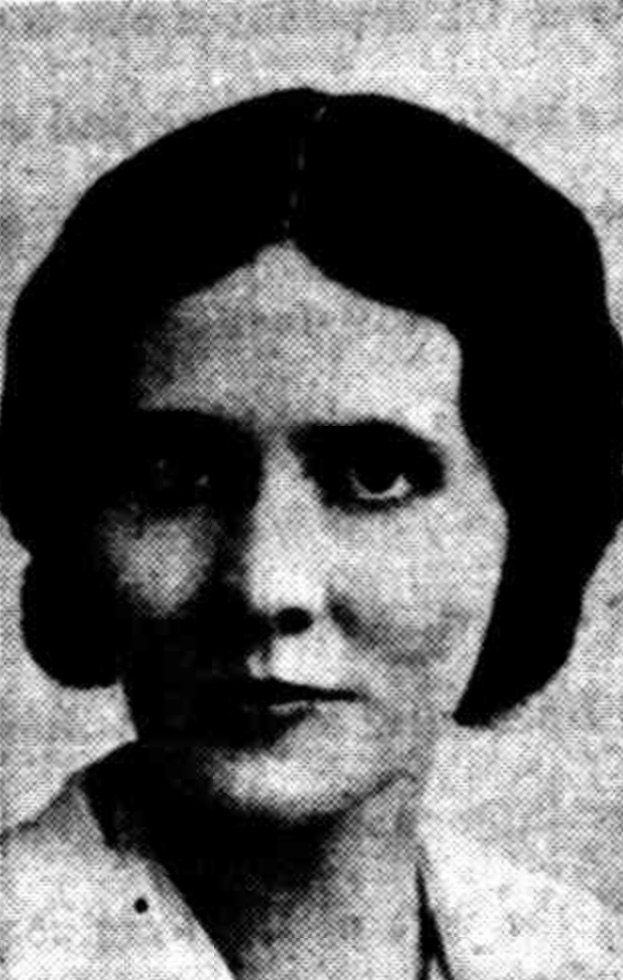
- Born: Jean Isobel Bradley; 29 December 1906; Wiluna, Western Australia
- Died: 30 December 1991 (aged 85); South Perth
- Education: University of Melbourne
- Employer: University of Western Australia
- Known for: teaching and theatre productions

Jean Isobel Dorrington Bradley, well known as Jeana Bradley born Jean Isobel Tweedie (29 December 1906 – 30 December 1991) was an Australian university lecturer and theatre producer. She led the drama teaching at the University of Western Australia creating annual outdoor productions that were part of the Festival of Perth's early success. She retired in 1971 but was never given a permanent position.

== Life ==
Bradley was born in 1906 in Wiluna. Her family had bought the Millbillillie cattle station that year and although she sometimes went to school she spent her early years with her aborigine friends. These friends gave her the name of Jeana which later became her name. She later noted that she never thought that she and her friends were not equals. Her parents were Isabel Alice (born) Hagger and her husband Thomas Tweedie. They were both born in the state of Victoria and she was their first child. Her father had operated a butcher's shop in Wiluna before he became a grazier in 1906.

Until the family moved to Melbourne in about 1916, she was largely self-taught as she read the books, magazines and journals at their home. In Melbourne she went to school and her father introduced his eldest child to Christy's Minstrel shows, pantomimes and melodramas. After she completed her education in Perth at the Methodist Ladies’ College in Claremont, she stayed on for two years as a monitor. Her mother was concerned that her voice was squeaky and she was sent for Elocution lessons with amateur actor and speech therapist Lionel Logue (who would later assist George VI's speech). She enrolled at the University of Western Australia when she was old enough and she graduated with both a degree in English and philosophy and a teacher's certificate in 1927. Her teacher's certificate enabled her to teach at Perth College until 1930 when she enrolled at Melbourne University to take a master's degree.

In 1938 she was employed to teach biology, history and economics at St Hilda's Anglican School for Girls. This was a school in the Perth suburb of Mosman Park that was run by the Church of England. In 1939 she was awarded her master's degree. While at the school she led St Hilda's Dramatic Society. Her productions in 1942 included Macbeth and The Rehearsal and these led to her being invited by Professor Allan Edwards to lecture at the University of Western Australia.

In 1953 she married another lecturer. The marriage was short and there were no children. In the same year the Festival of Perth was founded and in its first year there were 42,000 attendees. Bradley's open air production that year was said to be a reason that the festival was given the go ahead. In the first year there was a production of Dark of the Moon. Bradley and her students created outdoor productions that continued each year until 1969.

In 1967 she was still working on three year contracts at the university. In this year it was renewed again with her promoted to senior lecturer. She retired in 1971 after another timed contract. She was never given a permanent position. She died in 1991 at South Perth.
