= A Touch of Cloth =

- Genre: Satire; Police procedural
- Created by: Charlie Brooker; Boris Starling
- Written by: Charlie Brooker; Daniel Maier; Ben Caudell; Jason Hazeley; Joel Morris
- Directed by: Jim O'Hanlon
- Starring: John Hannah; Suranne Jones; Julian Rhind-Tutt; Navin Chowdhry; Adrian Bower; Daisy Beaumont
- Country of origin: United Kingdom
- Original language: English
- No. of series: 3
- No. of episodes: 6

Production
- Running time: 45 minutes
- Production company: Zeppotron

Original release
- Network: Sky1
- Release: 26 August 2012 – 10 August 2014

A Touch of Cloth is a British television comedy series created and written by Charlie Brooker and Daniel Maier, shown on Sky One. A parody of British police procedural dramas, it stars John Hannah as Jack Cloth, a police detective with personal problems, and Suranne Jones as Anne Oldman, his colleague. The title is a play on the title of the detective series A Touch of Frost and the British expression "touching cloth," a euphemism for a desperate need to defecate. The DVD of the first series was released in the UK on 3 September 2012, and the second and third series were released on 1 September 2014.

== Cast ==
- John Hannah as D.I. Jack Cloth
- Suranne Jones as D.C/D.I. Anne Oldman
- Julian Rhind-Tutt as A.C.C. Tom Boss
- Navin Chowdhry as D.C. Asap Qureshi
- Adrian Bower as D.S. Des Hairihan
- Daisy Beaumont as Dr. Natasha Sachet
- Todd Carty as D.C. Todd Carty (Series 1–2)
- Karen Gillan as D.C. Kerry Newblood (Series 3)

== Series overview ==
| Series | Episodes | Originally released | |
| Series | Episodes | First released | Last released |
|---|---|---|---|
| 1 | 2 | 26 August 2012 | 27 August 2012 |
| 2 | 2 | 25 August 2013 | 1 September 2013 |
| 3 | 2 | 9 August 2014 | 10 August 2014 |

== Episodes ==
=== Series 1 (2012) ===
Guest stars in this series include Raquel Cassidy as Claire Hawkchurch; Theo Barklem-Biggs as Darren Crossway; Brian Cox as Bill Ball and Kate Fleetwood as Kate Cloth.

| No. overall | No. in series | Title | Directed by | Written by | Original release date | UK viewers (millions) |
|---|---|---|---|---|---|---|
| 1 | 1 | "The First Case: Part One" | Jim O'Hanlon | Charlie Brooker & Daniel Maier | 26 August 2012 | 1.17 |
Former DI Jack Cloth (John Hannah) quit his profession after his wife was murdered. Jack is called back in to investigate a new killing and is assigned a new partner, DC Anne Oldman (Suranne Jones). After inspecting the crime scene, they are confronted by their Chief Constable, Tom Boss (Julian Rhind-Tutt), who informs them he wants answers quickly and gives them an unrealistic deadline. During the ensuing investigation, subsequent murders are discovered, and a link is revealed between all the victims and a witness.
| 2 | 2 | "The First Case: Part Two" | Jim O'Hanlon | Charlie Brooker & Daniel Maier | 27 August 2012 | 0.82 |
After discovering that the killer has been focusing on the former jurors of an old murder case, Cloth instructs his team to find all the remaining jurors and get them into a safe house. Cloth then uses a clear board to organize the evidence, which helps the team to pinpoint their prime suspect, Bradstock. Later that evening, while working together in the office, "sexual tension" pops up between Cloth and Oldman, only to be interrupted by a phone call from Oldman’s bisexual partner, Gemma (Jeany Spark). During the ensuing search for Bradstock, Cloth discovers that an ex-officer, DCI Bill Ball (Brian Cox), was involved in framing Bradstock for the murder he was convicted of, back in 1996. Subsequent murders dishearten Cloth, and he is invariably chastised by his boss, Chief Constable Boss, who threatens to suspend him. However, Oldman sees through the masquerade and reveals to Cloth the real identity of the killer.

=== Series 2 (2013) ===
Guest stars in this series include Anna Chancellor as Hope Goodgirl; Stephen Dillane as Macratty; Gwyneth Powell as Mrs McClusky; and guest appearances from Graham Cole, Peter Dean, Konnie Huq, Rufus Hound and Richard Osman.

| No. overall | No. in series | Title | Directed by | Written by | Original release date | UK viewers (millions) |
|---|---|---|---|---|---|---|
| 3 | 1 | "Undercover Cloth: Part One" | Jim O'Hanlon | Charlie Brooker, Ben Caudell, Jason Hazeley & Joel Morris | 25 August 2013 | 0.51 |
Todd Carty is fatally shot during a bank robbery, and with his own blood scrawls "Macratty" on the floor, and "Contact Jack Cloth" on a cloth. Cloth has retired from the police force and works as a taxi driver. His former colleague and lover, DC Anne Oldman, finds him at the cemetery visiting his wife's grave, where she asks for his help. Although he refuses at first, Cloth eventually returns to the force to lead the investigation despite tensions arising from the reinstatement of Assistant Chief Constable Tom Boss, who killed Cloth's wife and several jurors in the previous series – but has apologised, undergone a course and not killed anyone for months, and from his previous relationship with Oldman. Cloth goes undercover as a criminal named Jacques Copper and eventually gains a meeting with the mysterious "guv'nor" of the bank robbers, Mr Macratty (Stephen Dillane). Cloth gets further in with Macratty's gang when he offers them a kilogram of heroin, which he had previously stolen from the Vice Squad tuck shop, and is offered sexual services with a dancer at Macratty's club, who begs him to help her escape. Meanwhile, Oldman is being seduced in more ways than one by mayoral candidate Hope Goodgirl (Anna Chancellor), who wants her to take Boss' position as chief of police.
| 4 | 2 | "Undercover Cloth: Part Two" | Jim O'Hanlon | Charlie Brooker, Ben Caudell, Jason Hazeley & Joel Morris | 1 September 2013 | 0.42 |
Cloth's cover is nearly blown when one of Macratty's henchmen sees him meeting with Oldman in a café and leaves an answering machine message before Cloth crushes him with a bulldozer. After a further test of Cloth's character, Macratty trusts him enough to reveal that he works for the "Big Man", and that the gang's target is a small museum exhibiting the world's largest collection of gold, diamonds and cocaine—although Cloth is assigned to retrieve a nuclear detonator while the rest of the gang raids the museum. With his cover blown, and driven by Katya's death, Cloth and the team realise the nuclear bomb is intended to destroy the "Help a Blameless Child" telethon, and they rush to the TV studio to confront the mysterious "Big Man".

=== Series 3 (2014) ===
Guest stars in this series include Jessie Morell as Ivy Branch and Adrian Dunbar as Damien Vull.

| No. overall | No. in series | Title | Directed by | Written by | Original release date | UK viewers (millions) |
|---|---|---|---|---|---|---|
| 5 | 1 | "Too Cloth for Comfort: Part One" | Jim O'Hanlon | Charlie Brooker | 9 August 2014 | 0.54 |
A sexy female rookie, Newblood, (Karen Gillan) has joined Cloth's team. At her first crime scene, the team discovers the body of Cloth's brother, Terry. Despite the fact they weren't even close, Cloth is devastated. Newblood finds a few clues that have been overlooked earning her Cloth's attention. Meanwhile, Oldman has turned to drink in an attempt to get over being spurned by her boss.
| 6 | 2 | "Too Cloth for Comfort: Part Two" | Jim O'Hanlon | Charlie Brooker | 10 August 2014 | 0.44 |
Cloth continues the search for his brother's murderer, having been led to a weird retreat where Terry was receiving treatment for anger issues aimed toward a certain sibling. But when the body count begins to rise, Cloth realises that the culprit is closer to home than he first thought.

=== Series 4 ===
A joke trailer for the fourth series ended the last episode of series three.

John Hannah claimed, in 2015, that the series had been cancelled. "I imagine that's dead. I think it's been too long. I loved that show. Charlie wanted to do more, everyone did. It was Sky I guess. There might have been something to do with the negotiations, I don't know. We did the first one, then they wanted a lot more and Charlie wasn't sure he could sustain it over twelve episodes. So we did two more and then by the third one, they had figured out what they were doing. I think it's dead, it's a couple of years since we did that now. Normally when these things go, they go pretty quickly because people have other commitments, and Charlie is busy. It's a real shame. I doubt I'll be playing DI McDoodah for the next few years!"

== Critical reception ==
A Touch of Cloth received mixed reviews. In its review of the first series, The Guardian wrote that the show is "stuffed to the rafters with jokes", noting the variety of both good and bad jokes. Radio Times also commented on the hit-and-miss nature of the show: "while a lot of [the jokes] don’t stick ... when it’s funny, it’s deliriously so."

Again the show was both criticised and praised for its relentless jokes, with one critic calling the second series "black-hole dense with good gags" and noting that "there may be nothing quite so brilliant on British TV this year", but saying he "couldn't wait for the experience to end", observing Brooker's use of "cop drama clichés" to "strangle [the viewer] with unremitting genius." Series 2 received a similar critical response, with Time Out giving 3 out of 5 stars to the first episode and 2 out of 5 stars to the second episode.

== See also ==
- Police Squad!, a similar American TV series from the 1980s that spawned the Naked Gun film series.
- Angie Tribeca, a similar American TV series that satirises American procedurals.
- Sledge Hammer!, a sustained satire of Dirty Harry and other action heroes.
