= Nate Jackson (American football) =

American football player and writer (born 1979)

No. 14, 89, 81
- Position: Tight end

Personal information
- Born: June 4, 1979 (age 47); San Jose, California, U.S.
- Listed height: 6 ft 3 in (1.91 m)
- Listed weight: 235 lb (107 kg)

Career information
- High school: Pioneer (San Jose, California)
- College: Menlo
- NFL draft: 2002: undrafted

Career history
- San Francisco 49ers (2002–2003)*; Denver Broncos (2003–2008); → Rhein Fire (2004); Cleveland Browns (2009)*; Las Vegas Locomotives (2010)*
- * Offseason or practice squad member only

Awards and highlights
- 3× NCAA Division III All-American (1999, 2000, 2001); Division III West-Region Offensive Player of the Year (2001); Menlo College Hall of Fame (2009)

Career NFL statistics
- Receptions: 27
- Receiving yards: 240
- Receiving touchdowns: 2
- Stats at Pro Football Reference

Nathan Ross Jackson (born June 4, 1979) is a writer and former American football tight end. Undrafted out of Menlo College in 2002, he spent most of his professional career with the Denver Broncos from 2003 to 2008 before injury problems ended his career in 2009. After retirement, Jackson began writing football-related commentary for the New York Times and various online publications, frequently drawing upon his experiences as a player. His memoir Slow Getting Up: A Story of NFL Survival from the Bottom of the Pile was published in 2013.

== College career ==
A graduate of Pioneer High School in San Jose, California, Jackson played at Menlo College from 1999 to 2001 (when it was a member of NCAA Division III) and was a key factor in helping the school get attention for its athletics programs. During those seasons he set many records as a wide receiver. He was named first-team All-American during every season he was enrolled, and won the NCAA D-III Offensive Player of the Year after his senior year in 2001. Jackson was inducted into the Menlo College Athletics Hall of Fame in 2009.

== Professional career ==
=== San Francisco 49ers ===
After going unselected in the 2002 NFL draft, Jackson was signed as an undrafted free agent by the San Francisco 49ers on the recommendation of former 49ers coach Bill Walsh, whose son was the athletic director at Menlo College. After suffering a shoulder injury during training camp he was cut by the 49ers, but was re-signed when the 2002 season ended.

=== Denver Broncos ===
Jackson was traded to the Denver Broncos prior to the 2003 NFL season. He spent most of 2003 on the practice squad before appearing in his first NFL game on December 28, 2003.

Jackson was allocated to the Rhein Fire of NFL Europe for the spring of 2004. During Jackson's 2004 season with the Broncos he emerged as an option at receiver, catching 8 passes for 73 yards, and also recorded 7 special teams tackles.

Jackson was converted from wide receiver to tight end prior to the start of the 2005 season.

Jackson made his first career start during the 2007 season but later tore a groin muscle.

Jackson's last season with the Broncos was in 2008, during which he set career highs with 11 receptions for 84 yards, while also scoring a touchdown. He was released by the Broncos in February 2009, following the hiring of new head coach Josh McDaniels one month earlier.

=== Cleveland Browns ===
Jackson signed with the Cleveland Browns prior to the 2009 season but was released before the season began.

=== Las Vegas Locomotives ===
Jackson signed with the Las Vegas Locomotives of the UFL but never played in any games. His football career came to an end after he suffered a hamstring injury in training camp.

== Life after football ==
=== Writing career ===
Beginning in 2010, Jackson contributed articles to various popular websites and newspapers on a freelance basis. His writing about the NFL has appeared in Slate, Deadspin, The Daily Beast, The New York Times The Wall Street Journal, BuzzFeed, and Defector. His memoir Slow Getting Up: A Story of NFL Survival from the Bottom of the Pile was released by HarperCollins on September 17, 2013. It received favorable reviews including from the New York Times which said of Jackson, "He's that unicornlike rarity among former football players: He can write." Jackson published his second book, Fantasy Man: A Former NFL Player's Descent into the Brutality of Fantasy Football, in September 2016.

On August 7, 2013, an excerpt from Jackson's memoir was published in the alternative weekly newspaper Cleveland Scene. Focusing on his brief stint on the Browns practice squad just prior to the 2009 season, Jackson describes the Browns players as having been "deep in despair" with "no fight left in them." He attributed the poor state of affairs to Browns then-head coach Eric Mangini, of whom he was highly critical. According to Jackson, the Browns' players were already beaten down because Mangini didn't treat them with respect, unlike Broncos coach Mike Shanahan.

In a piece written for Defector published on February 21, 2024, Jackson admitted to using human growth hormone to recover from an injury after leaving the Broncos.

=== Medical cannabis advocacy ===
Jackson has called on the NFL to remove cannabis from its list of banned substances, citing the pain-relieving capabilities of the drug as well as its neuroprotective properties. During his NFL career Jackson used cannabis as a preferred alternative to opioid painkillers which he sought to avoid as much as possible. Jackson has spoken out on the NFL's policy towards cannabis in various media, including the New York Times opinion page, CBS This Morning, and an episode of HBO's Real Sports examining cannabis use in the NFL.

Jackson is a board member of Athletes for Care, a group that advocates for athletes on various issues of health and safety including the use of cannabis as medicine. Through Athletes for Care, Jackson co-hosts the Caveman Poet Society podcast along with Eben Britton. Jackson is also a member of the Gridiron Cannabis Coalition, which advocates for the NFL to change its cannabis policy.

=== Sports-talk radio ===
Jackson was hired as a talk-show host at Sports Radio 104.3 The Fan in Denver on July 10, 2020.
