= Sir Dermot Milman, 8th Baronet =

English cricketer and rugby union player

Personal information
- Full name: Dermot Lionel Kennedy Milman
- Born: 24 October 1912; Eltham, Kent, England
- Died: 13 January 1990 (aged 77); Warlingham, Surrey, England
- Batting: Right-handed
- Bowling: Slow left-arm orthodox
- Relatives: Lionel Milman (father); George Milman (great-uncle)

Domestic team information
- Years: Team
- 1931–1936: Bedfordshire
- 1932–1933: Cambridge University

Career statistics
Competition	First-class
Matches	2
Runs scored	15
Batting average	7.50
100s/50s	–/–
Top score	7*
Balls bowled	276
Wickets	4
Bowling average	35.50
5 wickets in innings	–
10 wickets in match	–
Best bowling	3/55
Catches/stumpings	–/–
- Source: Cricinfo, 25 July 2019

Sir Dermot Lionel Kennedy Milman, 8th Baronet (24 October 1912 – 13 January 1990) was an English first-class cricketer and rugby union international, and the eighth of the Milman baronets of Levaton-in-Woodland in the County of Devon.

== Early life and sporting career ==
The son of the Anglo-Irish cricketer and British Army officer Lionel Milman and his wife, Marjorie Aletta Clark-Kennedy, he was born at Eltham in October 1912. He was educated at Bilton Grange and Uppingham School, before going up to Corpus Christi College, Cambridge. While at Cambridge, he made two appearances in first-class cricket for Cambridge University. The first came in 1932 against Sussex, while the second came against Northamptonshire in 1933. Playing as a slow left-arm orthodox bowler, he took 4 wickets in his two matches, with best figures of 3 for 55. In addition to playing first-class cricket, Milman also played minor counties cricket for Bedfordshire from 1931 to 1936, making 36 appearances in the Minor Counties Championship. He made four rugby union Test appearances for England, debuting against Wales at Twickenham in the 1937 Home Nations Championship. The following year he gained three further Test caps in the 1938 Home Nations Championship.

== War service and later life ==
Milman served in the Royal Army Service Corps during the Second World War, having been promoted to the rank of lieutenant shortly before the beginning of the war in June 1939. He married Muriel Taylor in November 1941, with the couple having one daughter. He was mentioned in dispatches during the course of the war, with Milman ending the war with the war substantive rank of captain. He was made the full rank of captain of May 1949, at which point he was also granted the temporary rank of major. He was a liaison officer for the Hostel Development British Council. He succeeded his father as the eighth baronet on 2 November 1962. He was succeeded upon his death in January 1990 by his brother, Sir Derek Milman, 9th Baronet. His great-uncle, George Milman, also played first-class cricket.

Baronetage of Great Britain
Preceded by Lionel Milman	Baronet (of Levaton-in-Woodland); 1962–1990	Succeeded by Derek Milman
