= Swinging with the Finkels =

- U.K. Theatrical release poster
- Directed by: Jonathan Newman
- Screenplay by: Jonathan Newman
- Produced by: Thomas Augsberger; David Mutch; Deepak Nayar; Philip von Alvensleben
- Starring: Mandy Moore; Martin Freeman; Melissa George
- Cinematography: Dirk Nel
- Edited by: Eddie Hamilton
- Music by: Mark Thomas
- Production companies: Kintop Pictures; Reliance; Starlight Films; Filmaka.com
- Distributed by: Moving Pictures Film and Television (United States); Freestyle Releasing (U.S.)
- Release dates: 17 June 2011 (United Kingdom); 26 August 2011 (United States)
- Running time: 85 minutes
- Country: United Kingdom
- Language: English

Swinging with the Finkels is a 2011 British comedy film directed by Jonathan Newman and starring Mandy Moore, Martin Freeman and Melissa George. The screenplay concerns a wealthy London couple who decide to take up "swinging" (as in "partner swapping") in an attempt to save their struggling marriage. The film was picked up by Freestyle Releasing and had a limited release date in the United States on 26 August 2011.

== Cast ==
- Martin Freeman as Alvin Finkel
- Mandy Moore as Ellie Finkel
- Melissa George as Janet
- Jonathan Silverman as Peter
- Richard Shelton as Trevor (original)
- Jerry Stiller as Mr. Winters
- Angus Deayton as Richard
- Edward Akrout as Andrew
- John Barrard as Old Man
- Paul Chowdhry as Henry

== Production notes ==
The 2011 film was based on Sex with the Finkels (2008), an original short film also from director Jonathan Newman.

The film reportedly served as a vehicle for co-star Mandy Moore to extend her acting range beyond "good girl" roles.

== Reception ==
On the review aggregator website Rotten Tomatoes, 0% of 19 critics' reviews are positive, with an average rating of 3.4/10.
