= Henry Hart Milman =

English historian and churchman (1791–1868)

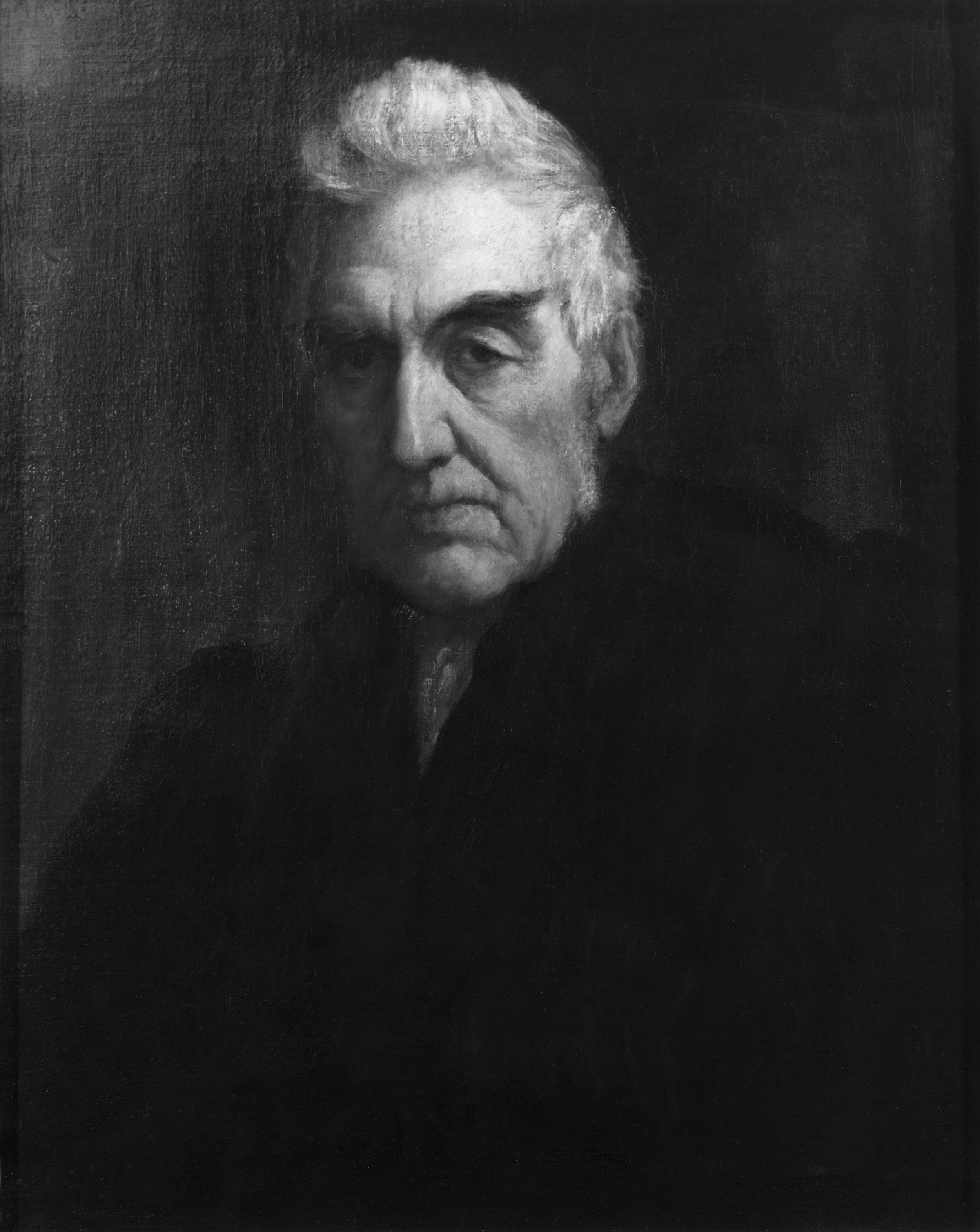
Henry Hart Milman, by George Frederic Watts, circa 1863

Henry Hart Milman (10 February 1791 – 24 September 1868) was an English historian and ecclesiastic.

== Life ==
He was born in London, the third son of Sir Francis Milman, 1st Baronet, physician to King George III (see Milman Baronets). Educated at Eton and at Brasenose College, Oxford, his university career was brilliant. He won the Newdigate prize with a poem on the Apollo Belvidere in 1812, was elected a fellow of Brasenose in 1814, and in 1816 won the English essay prize with his Comparative Estimate of Sculpture and Painting. In 1816 he was ordained, and two years later became parish priest of St Mary's, Reading.

In 1821 Milman was elected professor of poetry at Oxford; and in 1827 he delivered the Bampton lectures on The character and conduct of the Apostles considered as an evidence of Christianity. In 1835, Sir Robert Peel made him the rector of St Margaret's, Westminster, and a canon of Westminster, and in 1849 he became Dean of St Paul's. He was elected a Foreign Honorary Member of the American Academy of Arts and Sciences in 1864.

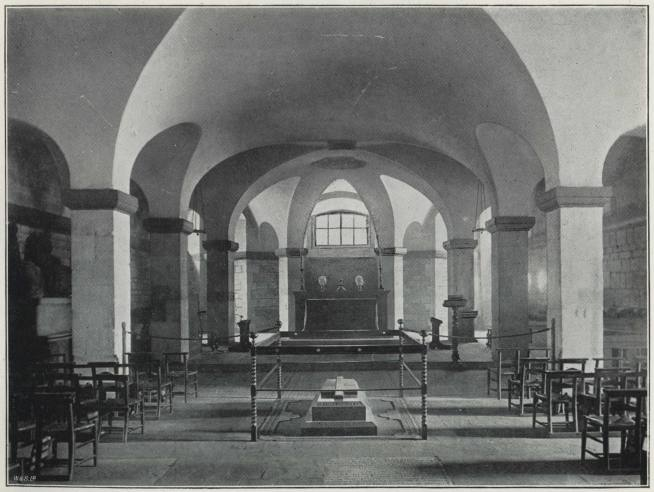
Milman's original tomb in St. Paul's Cathedral

Milman was buried in the crypt of St. Paul's Cathedral, where his grave was marked by an elaborate tomb. When the Chapel of the Order of the British Empire was created, the original tomb was replaced by a slab in the floor.

== Works ==
Milman made his appearance as a dramatist with his tragedy Fazio (produced on the stage under the title of The Italian Wife). He also wrote Samor, the Lord of The Bright City, the subject of which was taken from British legend, the "bright city" being Gloucester. In subsequent poetical works he was more successful, notably the Fall of Jerusalem (1820) and The Martyr of Antioch (1822, based on the life of Saint Margaret the Virgin), which was used as the basis for a "sacred musical drama" by Arthur Sullivan. The influence of Byron is seen in his Belshazzar (1822). Another tragedy, Anne Boleyn, followed in 1826. Milman also wrote "When our-heads are bowed with woe," and other hymns; a version of the Sanskrit episode of Nala and Damayanti; and translations of the Agamemnon of Aeschylus and the Bacchae of Euripides. His poetical works were published in three volumes in 1839.

Turning to another field, Milman published in 1829 his History of the Jews, which is memorable as the first by an English clergyman which treated the Jews as an Oriental tribe, recognized sheikhs and amirs in the Old Testament, sifted and classified documentary evidence, and evaded or minimized the miraculous. In consequence, the author was attacked and his preferment was delayed. His History of Christianity to the Abolition of Paganism in the Roman Empire (1840) had been completely ignored; but the continuation of his major work, the History of Latin Christianity (1855), which has passed through many editions, was well received. In 1838 he had edited Edward Gibbon's Decline and Fall of the Roman Empire, and in the following year published his Life of Gibbon.

Milman was also responsible for an edition of Horace, and when he died he had almost finished a history of St Paul's Cathedral, which was completed and published by his son, A. Milman (London, 1868), who also collected and published in 1879 a volume of his essays and articles.

Milman wrote the hymn, Ride On, Ride On in Majesty!, often sung on Palm Sunday.

== Family ==
By his wife, Mary Ann Cockell, a daughter of Lieut.-General William Cockell, Milman had four sons and two daughters. Among the sons were William Milman (1824–1908), Arthur Milman, who wrote a biography about his father, and Sir Archibald Milman (1834–1902), Clerk of the House of Commons. His nephew, Robert Milman (1816–1876), was Bishop of Calcutta from 1867 until his death, and was the author of a Life of Torquato Tasso (1850).
