= Lionel Milman =

Anglo-Irish cricketer and army officer (1877–1962)

Lionel Charles Patrick Milman
- Born: 23 February 1877; Clonmel, Ireland
- Died: 2 November 1962 (aged 85); Wimbledon, Surrey, England
- Military career
- Allegiance: United Kingdom
- Branch: British Army; British Indian Army (secondment)
- Service years: 1900–1922
- Rank: Brevet lieutenant colonel
- Units: Royal Artillery; Royal Army Ordnance Department
- Commands: Assistant Director (Ministry of Munitions)
- Conflicts: First World War
- Awards: Companion of the Order of St Michael and St George

Sir Lionel Charles Patrick Milman, 7th Baronet CMG (23 February 1877 – 2 November 1962) was an Anglo-Irish British Army officer, first-class cricketer, and the seventh of the Milman baronets of Levaton-in-Woodland in the County of Devon.

== Early life and military service ==
Born at Clonmel in County Tipperary, the third son of Sir Francis John Milman, 4th Baronet and his wife Katherine Grace Moore. He was educated in England at Marlow, before going up to Sidney Sussex College, Cambridge in 1896. After graduating in 1899, Milman followed his fathers footsteps and enlisted in the Royal Artillery with the rank of second lieutenant in September 1900. He was seconded for duty in British India with the Hyderabad Contingent in November 1901. While serving in British India, Milman made two appearances in first-class cricket for the Europeans against the Parsees in the 1901–02 Bombay Presidency Matches, taking four wickets. Returning to England and the Royal Artillery, he was made a lieutenant in October 1903. He fell ill in 1905, enough to be placed on half-pay on account of his ill health. By 1910 Milman was an officer in charge of cadets at the Royal Military Academy, Woolwich, with his tenure in that role ending in January 1912.

== World War I and later military service ==
With the start of World War I, Milman was made a captain and given the responsibility of ordnance officer, 4th class, in the Royal Army Ordnance Department. By April 1915, he was made an ordnance officer, 3rd class with the temporary rank of major. He relinquished his temporary grading of ordnance officer in January 1916, and in April 1916 he was seconded to the Minister of Munitions and given the temporary rank of lieutenant colonel while employed by the ministry, which he became the assistant director of in June 1916. Milman was made CMG in the 1917 New Year Honours. He was made a temporary brigadier-general in January 1918.

Shortly after the end of the war, Milman was made a brevet lieutenant colonel in December 1918, and he was placed on the reserve list in March 1922. By 1932 he had reached the age limit for liability to recall and was placed on the retired list.

== Personal life ==
He married in 1911 Marjorie Aletta Clark-Kennedy, daughter of Colonel Arthur Harry Clark-Kennedy, with whom he had three sons and a daughter. He succeeded his brother Sir William Ernest Milman, 6th Baronet as the seventh baronet on 30 August 1962. However, he only held this title for 64 days prior to his death on 2 November 1962 at Wimbledon.

He was succeeded by his eldest son Sir Dermot Milman, 8th Baronet, who also played first-class cricket. His uncle, George Milman, was also a first-class cricketer.

Baronetage of Great Britain
Preceded by William Milman	Baronet (of Levaton-in-Woodland); 1962	Succeeded by Dermot Milman
