= Jonathan Newman =

British filmmaker and writer (born 1972)

- Born: 1 September 1972 (age 53); London, United Kingdom
- Occupations: film director, scriptwriter

Jonathan Newman is a British filmmaker and writer. Newman made his first feature film at the age of 25. Being Considered starred James Dreyfus and David Tennant. His recent movies include the action adventure film Mariah Mundi and the Midas Box, starring Sam Neill, Michael Sheen, Lena Headey and Keeley Hawes, with the lead of Mariah Mundi played by Welsh actor Aneurin Barnard. Retitled The Adventurer: The Curse of the Midas Box, the film was released theatrically in USA on 10 January 2014. In 2012 Newman wrote and directed the critically acclaimed film Foster, starring Toni Collette, Ioan Gruffudd, Richard E. Grant, Anne Reid and Hayley Mills, as well as Swinging with the Finkels, which stars Martin Freeman, singer/actress Mandy Moore, Melissa George, Jonathan Silverman, Angus Deayton and Jerry Stiller. Foster, aka "Angel in the House' (US Title) won Best Feature film at the Rhode Island Film Festival 2013 as voted for by the youth jury. In 2008 and 2013, Newman was longlisted for The Hospital Club 100 media hotlist. Newman is credited as an assistant author of The Guerilla Film Makers Movie Blueprint.

== Early years ==
Newman was born in London, England. He moved to Los Angeles when he was 5, where he quickly got a passion for films and filmmaking.

In 1990, he attended Brandeis University. In 1994, he completed a master's degree at the Northern Film School in Leeds.

== Filmography ==
=== Feature films ===
- Being Considered: Writer/Director
- Teeth: Writer/Director
- Swinging with the Finkels: Writer/Director
- Foster: Writer/Director
- The Adventurer: The Curse of the Midas Box: Director

=== Television ===
- Mustang Drift (Ford commercial): Director/Producer
- Father's Day: Writer/Director
- Perspectives: Reality Bites: Director/Executive Producer
- Jailbreak: Director

=== Short films ===
- Models Required: Director
- Foster: Writer/Director/Producer
- Sex with the Finkels: Writer/Director
