= Milman baronets =

Title in the Baronetage of Great Britain

- Escutcheon of the Milman Baronets of Levaton-in-Woodland
- Creation date: 1800
- Status: extant
- Motto: Deus nobiscum quis contra, God with us, who against us?

The Milman baronetcy, of Levaton-in-Woodland in the County of Devon, is a title in the Baronetage of Great Britain. It was created on 28 November 1800 for Francis Milman, Physician-in-Ordinary to King George III and President of the Royal College of Physicians.

The 7th Baronet was a brigadier-general in the British Army.

== Milman baronets, of Levaton-in-Woodland (1800) ==
- Sir Francis Milman, 1st Baronet (1746–1821)
- Sir William George Milman, 2nd Baronet (1781–1857)
- Sir William Milman, 3rd Baronet (1813–1885)
- Sir Francis John Milman, 4th Baronet (1842–1922)
- Sir Francis Milman, 5th Baronet (1872–1946)
- Sir William Ernest Milman, 6th Baronet (1875–1962)
- Sir Lionel Charles Patrick Milman, 7th Baronet (1877–1962)
- Sir Dermot Lionel Kennedy Milman, 8th Baronet (1912–1990)
- Sir Derek Milman, 9th Baronet (1918–1999)
- Sir David Patrick Milman, 10th Baronet (born 1945)

The heir apparent is the present holder's son Thomas Hart Milman (born 1976).

== Extended family ==
- Francis Miles Milman (1783–1856), second son of the 1st Baronet, was a lieutenant-general in the Coldstream Guards. He was the father of (1) Egerton Charles William Miles Milman, a major-general in the Army, and (2) Gustavus Hamilton Lockwood Milman (died 1915), a major-general in the Royal Artillery who married Louisa Mary, 15th Baroness Berkeley.
- The Very Reverend Henry Hart Milman, third son of the 1st Baronet, was a historian and ecclesiastic.

== Notes ==
Baronetage of Great Britain
Preceded by Dance baronets	Milman baronets of Levaton-in-Woodland; 28 November 1800	Succeeded by Peel baronets
