= Heroes Welcome UK =

British community partnership scheme

- Heroes Welcome UK Logo
- Abbreviation: HWUK
- Formation: 2008
- Type: Community Partnership
- Purpose: Encouraging communities to show support to members of the British Armed Forces servicemen and women
- Headquarters: Scarborough, North Yorkshire
- Region served: United Kingdom
- Official language: English
- National Co-ordinator: John Senior (founder)
- Website: heroeswelcome.co.uk
- Remarks: Freely adopted by local communities, Borough, District and County Councils.

Heroes Welcome is a scheme designed to encourage British communities to demonstrate support to members of the armed forces. The concept involves the displaying of a Heroes Welcome Sticker, this can be by either private individuals, or business operators and simply indicates a special welcome to service personnel. Heroes Welcome is not a charity or discount scheme, the minimum offer is; "A Warm Welcome", participating members may choose to offer a small discount or additional service upgrade if they wish, but this is not mandatory to membership of the scheme.

== History ==
The first Heroes Welcome scheme was launched in 2008 by the North Yorkshire resort town of Scarborough, it began as a simple reaction to the growing number of negative news reports regarding the poor treatment of service personnel by some in the community. The first posters were handmade by the staff of the Golden Grid Fish Restaurant and displayed with the help of the owner John Senior MBE TD, a retired Army Officer who had himself seen active service in Afghanistan during 2001/2002. The idea quickly found support amongst the Scarborough seafront business community and eventually came to the attention of the Town Mayor who requested that "Heroes Welcome in Scarborough" be formally adopted as good civic practice.

In May 2008 Scarborough became the first Heroes Welcome Town, ensuring that service personnel were offered a special warm welcome wherever the Heroes welcome logo was displayed. By June 2008 over 250 local businesses had joined up to the scheme, membership proved to be diverse ranging across political and socio economic boundaries, early members included the South Beach Donkey concession, New York Times best selling author the Reverend G.P Taylor and Stephen Joseph Theatre in the Round, home to the acclaimed British playwright Sir Alan Ayckbourn . The Scarborough scheme also won the support of a number of senior military and political figures, being seen as a simple and appropriate method for a community to show its open support to those serving in the Armed Forces. In March 2009 the founder, John Senior was invited by the Ministry of Defence, (Armed Forces Day Team) to give a presentation to members of the National Association of Civic Officers in order that they might better appreciate the benefits of forming closer relationships with the Armed Forces community. At the conclusion of the presentation a number of Civic Officers approached Senior wishing to explore the possibilities of joining the Heroes Welcome Scheme, at that time there was no facility or provision for a wider regional membership within the existing scheme.

In order to address this issue an advisory group was formed and under the guidance of Lieutenant Colonel Toby Gray the then Commanding Officer of the Coldstream Guards a set of guidelines were drawn up to ensure that the scheme was appropriate and focused towards the Junior Ranks. The overriding principle was to create an internet-based self-sustaining open resource that was fit for purpose and would require only the minimum amount of administrative input.

== Development ==
In June 2009, supported by the National Association of Civic officers, Heroes Welcome UK launched a national website at www.heroeswelcome.co.uk, and opened its membership to include those organizations, towns, cities and districts who wished to join the United Kingdom's only community partnership dedicated to the support of those serving in the Armed Forces. The first "Civic" member to join Heroes Welcome UK was the Borough of West Norfolk followed by Sefton District Council. Subsequently, additional towns, cities and districts joined up, each one setting up its own distinct "Heroes Welcome in Anyborough" scheme. The first county to join Heroes Welcome was Hampshire. The Chairman of the County Council, Anna McNair Scott, launched Heroes Welcome in Hampshire, at a ceremony held in the Great Hall of Winchester Castle, on Armistice Day 2011. This was followed on 5 March 2012 when Cllr John Fort, Chairman of North Yorkshire County Council launched Heroes Welcome in North Yorkshire from County Hall, Northallerton. The joining of Hampshire and North Yorkshire means that 70% of all UK based service personnel live in a Heroes Welcome area.

A full listing of Heroes Welcome Member Communities is published below (correct at 8 December 2011)

The Boroughs of: Beeston Beverley, Blackpool, Bootle, Bassetlaw District Council, Bournemouth Bridlington, Brighton, Bury St Edmonds, Chesterfield Cobham, Cranleigh, Dorchester, Downham, Ellesmere, Elmbridge, Ether, Farnham, Filey, Formby, Godalming, Great Yarmouth, Godmanchester, Guildford Guisborough, Haslemere, Herriot Country, Hove, Hull City Council, Hunstanton, Huntingdon, Kings Lynn, Kirkham, Lewes, London Taxis, Malton, Middlesbrough, Newhaven, Newhaven Fort, Oykel Regions, Pickering, Portland, Ramsey, Royal Wootton Bassett, Sandringham, Seaford, Scarborough, Southport, St Ives, St Neots, Stirling, Stockport, Swanage, Walton-on-Thames, Watton, Weston-super-Mare, Whitby, Weybridge, Weymouth, Woodbridge, Worthing, York, Hampshire, North Yorkshire.

In 2010 the Town of Royal Wootton Bassett became the Heroes Welcome UK Town of Honour, "Every repatriation of a fallen Serviceman or woman is a sad occasion. The people of Wootton Bassett will always show their respects to mark the bravery of these fine young people." A message to Heroes Welcome UK from the Mayor of Royal Wootton Bassett, Councillor Mary Champion.

== Falkland Islands ==
In June 2012 Heroes Welcome was launched across the Falkland Islands in support of the hosting for Veterans during this year's 30th Anniversary commemorations of the South Atlantic conflict. The Falkland's are the first Crown Territory to join the partnership and the local scheme coordinator is the Hon Keith Biles Speaker to the Falkland Islands Assembly.

== Gibraltar ==
On 29 January 2013 Heroes Welcome In Gibraltar was launched at a ceremony held in the City Hall attended by 120 civil and military invitees. The event was co-hosted by, The Chief Minister of Gibraltar Fabian Picardo, His Worship the Mayor Anthony Lima, British Forces Commander Gibraltar Commodore John Clink RN also in attendance was the scheme founder John Senior.

== Funding and support for military charities ==
Through its national network Heroes Welcome UK actively encourages the support of recognised military charities, maintaining a close relationship with many, including Help for Heroes, The Royal British Legion, SSAFA and the Soldiers Charity (Army Benevolent Fund).

Working with FAB, (Family Activity Breaks) Charity . Through its local network Heroes Welcome is able to directly assist the work of FAB charity. Family Activity Breaks is staffed by military volunteers from all ranks and services who organise a variety of residential activity holidays for military families who have suffered a bereavement. By mobilising local business operators Heroes Welcome is able to directly improve the offers of assistance and support available in and around thea visited.

Heroes Welcome as an entity is unable to seek charitable status (local government bodies cannot adopt charities). Without a regular funding stream the financing of local operations relies on the goodwill of each individual community scheme. The small amount of funding required for the cost of central administration (approximately £3,000/4,000 per year) is raised through private donations and the sale of G. P. Taylor's Mariah Mundi and the Midas Box series of novels. Copies of the books are sold directly from the Golden Grid Restaurant Scarborough which is understood to be the inspiration for the fictional Golden Kipper Restaurant owned by retired army officer Captain Jack Charity. A film version of the first book The Midas Box is now in production the cast includes, Sam Neill, Aneurin Barnard, Lena Headey, Ioan Gruffudd and Michael Sheen as Charity.

== A Night Before the Colours Sponsorship ==
In 2011 Adverset Media Solutions and Qdos Entertainment/HQ Theatre Group agreed to become the principle sponsor of "A Night Before the Colours", a spectacular military style biannual charity dinner 2012 held at the Scarborough Grand Spa, featuring military bands, display by the Corps of Drums, the last post, musical fireworks. Attended by 370 guests the sell out 2011 event raised over £24,000 for the Heroes Welcome in Scarborough chosen Charities, including the Royal British legion and Yorkshire Regiment Benevolent fund. The current Chairman of Qdos Entertainment PLC Nick J Thomas is also a supporter of Heroes Welcome in Scarborough through membership of his "gastro pub" the Copper Horse, Seamer.

== Future ==
The management committee chaired by the scheme founder John Senior, has committed to continue with the Heroes Welcome initiative until such time as it is felt no longer appropriate.

== Parliamentary Early Day Motion ==
Parliamentary business in the House of Commons of the United Kingdom Early Day Motion 1582 Print version HEROES WELCOME SCHEME Session: 2008–09 Date tabled: 3 June 2009 Primary sponsor: Robert Goodwill, Sponsors: John Grogan, Lindsay Hoyle, Mark Lancaster, Bob Russell, Nicholas Soames, That this House applauds the initiative of over 500 businesses in Scarborough that have already joined the Heroes Welcome scheme; notes that participants offer visiting service personnel special acknowledgement and discounts at hotels, restaurants and other service or retail firms; and calls on other towns and cities around the country to follow Scarborough's lead and join Heroes Welcome UK in order to give support, quiet recognition and a little extra hospitality as a way of showing gratitude to armed forces personnel and their families.

Filter EDMs by: Total number of signatures: 57

== Soldier magazine ==
Article February 2011 Report: Sharon Kean Picture: Graeme Main FROM the modest beginning of a hand-drawn poster in the window of a Scarborough restaurant, a scheme encouraging local communities to show their gratitude for the Armed Forces has quickly evolved to become a nationwide network. Hundreds of local councils and companies have now signed up for Heroes Welcome, a campaign urging organisations to display a sticker as a demonstration of their support for the Services, and the number of participating outfits is growing by the day. In addition to a warm reception, many of those who have enlisted offer troops, veterans and their families deals and discounts, pledging everything from cheap train tickets and cut- price taxi fares to special offers in hotels and spas. "You can say thanks to a fireman or police officer at the scene but for Servicemen and women who do their work over the hills and far away, it's harder," explained John Senior, the retired TA major-turned-restaurateur who launched the scheme in his home town two years ago. "Although we offered discounts in the restaurant we had no way of showing our gratitude for the job they do."
