= History of the Jews in Leeds =

History of the Jewish community of Leeds, England

The city of Leeds, in West Yorkshire, England has a Jewish community, where many notable people originated or settled. They have played a major part in the clothing trade, the business, professional and academic life of the City, and the wider world. The community numbers now fewer than 7,000 people.

== Demography ==
A community of nearly 60 Jews was present in Leeds by 1840, with their numbers rising to 219 by 1861. Around 1,000 were present prior to the increase in immigration from the Russian Empire starting in the early 1880s. In 1891 there were 8,000 Jews in Leeds, with more than 6,000 in the Leylands area alone by 1901. The concentration of Jews in some areas was so great that Templar Street was described as like a continental Jewish ghetto in the Yiddish press. The population continued to rise in the early 20th century, numbering 12 to 14,000 in 1901, and around 25,000 after 1914.

With the addition from 1933 of refugees from Nazi Germany, evacuees from the London Blitz, and later Holocaust survivors, the Leeds community may have peaked around 1945 to 1950 at 25 to 29,000 people. The population has since been in decline for many years, despite arrivals from smaller regional communities. Steady emigration to Israel began post-war and has continued, but during the 1970s Leeds still had the highest Jewish proportion of population of any British city.

The 2011 UK census recorded 6,847 people reporting their religion as Jewish in the City of Leeds metropolitan district, 0.9% of the district's population. In the Leeds built-up area, there were 6,136 (1.3% of population), concentrated in areas such as Alwoodley ward (3,270, 14.4% of population).

== Development ==
The first settlers in the 18th century were mainly German-born; many were wool-merchants attracted to this major industry of West Yorkshire. The first marriage was recorded in 1842. Early residents included Lazarus Levi.

The history of the community is closely linked with Hull, which was connected by railway to Leeds from 1840. Most of those who settled in Leeds immigrated via the Humber ports of Hull, and Grimsby, and many lived in Hull, or stayed temporarily, part of a migrant population mainly bound via Liverpool for America. As Leeds was a city undergoing economic expansion, on this migration route, and as Jews had tailoring experience or local contacts, a sizeable community developed. Settlement was primarily in the poor Leylands district of Leeds, a low-rent area which attracted immigrants. By the mid-1890s Leylands was predominantly Jewish. The great majority of Jewish immigrants in this period were Lithuanian Jews from within the Northern Pale of Settlement of the Russian Empire.

Jews worked in notoriously insanitary sweatshops as tailoring became the dominant trade. With the slum clearance of 1936–7, the Jews of Leeds moved northwards, from the central Leylands area, up around Chapeltown, and then further into Moortown and Alwoodley.

Many 1930s European refugees came to Leeds, often well-educated, including in 1937 the ORT training school from Berlin, and in 1938–40, Kindertransport children, followed by later survivors of the Holocaust. Before the war a local branch of the Association of Jewish Refugees was formed, and more recently the Leeds-based Holocaust Survivors' Fellowship Association.

=== Synagogues ===
The first synagogue in Leeds opened in 1846 in a converted private house in Back Rockingham Street, on the site of the current Merrion Centre. In 1861 it was replaced by a purpose-built building in Belgrave Street, known as the Great Synagogue, which closed in 1983. An office block was built on the site, and the synagogue is commemorated by a blue plaque placed by Leeds Civic Trust in 1991.

A synagogue in St. John's Place, New Briggate was opened in 1876, known as the Grinner Shul. It was replaced by the New Synagogue in Chapeltown Road of 1932, built in Byzantine style; the building closed in 1985, and is now used by the Northern School of Contemporary Dance.

The Vilna synagogue began in St Luke's Terrace, and moved to Exmouth Street before 1885. It merged into the New Vilna Synagogue in 1955, at Harrogate Road 1973–91, and incorporated into the Etz Chaim synagogue 1994, also on Harrogate Road, since 1982. Etz Chaim has its roots in the Leeds Jewish Workers' Burial and Trading Society of 1899, the Psalms of David Congregation originally in Bridge Street in 1884, as well as the New Synagogue.

The United Hebrew Congregation opened its current Shadwell Lane synagogue in 1986, incorporating congregations originally of the Great Synagogue, New Synagogue, New Leeds Congregation, Chapeltown United Synagogue, Louis Street Synagogue, and the Moortown Synagogue of 1937–86. The Byron Street Polish synagogue was founded 1893; moving to Louis Street around 1933, it closed in 1974.

Beth Hamedrash Hagadol synagogue, Templar Street, founded 1874, moved to Hope Street in 1886, Newton Road Chapeltown in 1937, and its present building in Street Lane, Moortown in 1969.

Shomrei Hadass Synagogue is the centre for strictly-orthodox Chabad-Lubavitch Hasidic Judaism in Leeds.

The Sinai Synagogue in Roundhay, Leeds was established as a congregation in 1944, and is affiliated to Reform Judaism. A new building was opened in 1960.

=== Cemeteries ===
The first Jewish cemetery in Leeds was opened in 1837, with local Jews previously having been buried in nearby Hull. There are today five Jewish cemeteries in Leeds: the Beth Hamedrash Hagadol cemetery, established 1955; Hill Top Cemeteries, established 1875; New Farnley Cemeteries, established 1896; the United Hebrew Congregation Cemetery, established 1840; and the Sinai Synagogue Cemetery, established in the 1950s.

The New Farnley cemetery contains nine Commonwealth war graves of Jewish service personnel, two from World War I and seven from World War II, with an additional World War II serviceman buried in the adjacent Louis Street Polish Jewish Cemetery. The United Hebrew Congregation cemetery contains 18 Commonwealth war graves of Jewish service personnel: six from World War I and 12 from World War II.

=== Charities and communal organisations ===
The first Jewish friendly society was founded in 1852. The Jewish Board of Guardians (est.1878) covered a range of activities, especially loans and grants in great numbers for immigrants to set up in business, or to continue on to North America. The Leeds Jewish Welfare Board has provided aid since 1878, and now runs a community centre and community support services, and operates a charity shop and three residential homes for adults with learning disabilities. The Leeds Jewish Housing Association has 500 homes. The Leeds Jewish Institute was founded in 1896, and the Jewish Young Men's Association by 1901. The Leeds Jewish Representative Council has been active since 1938.

The first Leeds Jewish trade union dates from 1876. The Amalgamated Jewish Tailors', Machinists' and Pressers' Union was officially founded in 1893, arising out of early organisations and strikes.

=== Schools ===
A Jews' Free School was founded in 1876, and Gower Street and other Board Schools in Leylands was effectively taken over by Jews by 1888. Brodetsky Primary School, which dates from 1968, and the secondary age Leeds Jewish Free School, opened 2013, both in Alwoodley, are affiliated to Orthodox Judaism. The Menorah primary school in Sandhill Lane is affiliated to the Haredi Chabad Lubavitch movement.

=== Businesses ===
Leeds had long been a centre of the wool trade. The first Jew in the Leeds mass wholesale tailoring business was Herman Friend around 1856. Large numbers of men and women were employed in back-room cutting and sewing, but not in the factory sector. In the 1930s, Jewish factories employed refugees from Europe. Jewish refugees also founded a law firm in Leeds in 1930.

=== Anti-Semitism ===
Mocking Jews in their sabbath clothes was once common-place in Leeds; and some town cafes refused to serve them. Violence culminated in the infamous riots of 1917 in the Leylands, destroying property and looting shops. Job discrimination was one reason Jews changed their names. Later, they found it almost impossible to join local golf clubs, so in 1923, they set up their own. Antisemitism continued in Leeds during the 1930s as refugees from Nazism arrived. Mosley's fascists marched in Leeds in 1936 leading to the Battle of Holbeck Moor.

Zechariah Deutch, a rabbi and chaplain at the University of Leeds, flew out to Israel in late 2023 to join the IDF. When he returned, he received death threats and police recommended to him that he go into hiding. The university issued a statement condemning the alleged threats.

== Notable people ==
=== Arts and entertainment ===
- Alec Baron (1913–91), filmmaker, playwright, founder of the Leeds Playhouse.
- Janina Bauman (1926–2009), journalist, writer, survivor of the Warsaw Ghetto.
- Jeff Christie (born 1946), lead singer and songwriter of Christie.
- Eta Cohen (1916–2012), violinist and teacher.
- Jeremy Dyson (born 1966), author and screenwriter.
- Gaynor Faye (born 1971), actress and writer best known for roles in Coronation Street and Emmerdale.
- Jason Feddy (born 1966), musician and cantor.
- Louise Finlay (1971–2014), head celebrity journalist for French weekly magazine Elle.
- Paula Froelich (born 1973), journalist and author of Mercury in Retrograde.
- Benny Green (1927-1998), jazz saxophonist, writer and broadcaster.
- Mark Knopfler (born 1949), singer-songwriter and guitarist of Dire Straits.
- Jacob Kramer (1892–1962), Russian-born Ukrainian–British painter and graphic designer
- James Lascelles (born 1953), musician who co-founded the Global Village Trucking Company,
- Sam Lee (born 1980), award-winning singer and songwriter.
- Elliot Levey (born 1973), theatre actor.
- Judith Levin (born 1936), landscape and still-life artist.
- Kay Mellor (1951–2022), writer and director.
- Philip Naviasky (1894–1983), artist in watercolour and oils.
- Ann Rachlin (born 1933), musician, children's author, awarded the MBE for her work with deaf children.
- Michael Roll (born 1946), pianist, first winner of the Leeds International Piano Competition.
- Bernard Schottlander (1924–99), German-born sculptor based in Leeds.
- Samantha Simmonds (born 1972/1973), news anchor for Sky News and BBC News.
- Barry Simmons (born 1948), quiz-show contestant on Eggheads and Brain of Britain.
- Marion Stein (1926–2014), Countess of Harewood, co-founder of Leeds International Piano Competition.
- Frankie Vaughan (1928–99), singer and actor best known for "Give Me the Moonlight, Give Me the Girl".
- Fanny Waterman (1920–2020), pianist, founder and director of the Leeds International Piano Competition, president of the Harrogate International Music Festival.
- Wendy Waterman (born 1944), pianist.
- Joash Woodrow (1927–2006), reclusive artist.
- Tamar Yellin (born 1963), author, winner of the 2007 Sami Rohr Prize.

=== Entrepreneurs and philanthropists ===
- Phillip Abrahams (1907–82), industrialist and Zionist, Chevalier of the Order of Leopold II.
- Montague Burton (1885–1952), founder of Burton Menswear.
- Barbara Cline (born 1935), volunteer for multiple charities.
- Manny Cussins (1905–87), businessman, chairman of Leeds United F.C.
- Henrietta Diamond (1876–1958), founded Herzl-Moser Hospital and the Leeds Ladies Zionist Association, forerunner to the Women's International Zionist Organisation.
- Colin Glass (born 1943), Chairman of UK Israel Business.
- Paul Hirsch (1834–1908), Leeds' first Jewish Magistrate.
- John D. Jackson (1933–2013), vice-chairman of Leeds Development Corporation, High Sheriff of West Yorkshire.
- Clive Labovitch (1932–94), co-founder of Haymarket Media Group and its magazines Management Today and Publishing News.
- Neville Labovitch (1927–2002), businessman, philanthropist, awarded the MBE for his work on the Silver Jubilee Exhibition.
- Trevor Lyttleton (born 1936), founder of the charity Contact the Elderly.
- George Lyttleton (1904–90), founder of Jewish day schools in Leeds and London.
- Jack Lyons (1916–2008), businessman and philanthropist, convicted in the Guinness share-trading fraud.
- Michael Marks (1859–1907), entrepreneur, co-founder of Marks & Spencer.
- Simon Marks, 1st Baron Marks of Broughton (1888–1964), businessman.
- Simon Morris (born 1977), businessman, director of Leeds United, convicted on charges of blackmail.
- Lloyd Rakusen (1881–1944), founder of Rakusen's.
- Leslie Silver (1925–2014), paint manufacturer, chairman of Leeds United F.C.
- Esther Simpson (1903–96), assisted European refugee academics upto and during World War II.
- Harris Sumrie (1866–1951), founder of C. and M. Sumrie Ltd.
- Arnold Ziff (1927–2004), property magnate, philanthropist, High Sheriff of West Yorkshire 1991–2.

=== Politicians and Activists ===
- Irwin Bellow (1923–2001), Leader of Leeds City Council 1975–9, served as Margaret Thatcher's Minister of State for Environment/Local Government 1983–4.
- Judith Chapman, Lord Mayor of Leeds 2015–6.
- Karl Cohen (1908–73), City Alderman, advocate for slum clearance.
- Jack Diamond (1907–2004), Labour and Social Democratic Party MP for Gloucester and Manchester Blackley, Chief Secretary to the Treasury, member of the House of Lords.
- Ronald Feldman, Lord Mayor of Leeds 1991–2.
- Joseph Finn (1865–1945), trade unionist.
- Joyce Gould, Baroness Gould of Potternewton (born 1932), trade-unionist, Labour activist, member of the House of Lords.
- Fabian Hamilton (born 1955), Labour MP for Leeds North East, Shadow Minister for Peace and Disarmament.
- Keith Joseph (1918–94), Conservative MP for Leeds North East.
- Gerald Kaufman (1930–2017), Labour MP, Minister of State for Industry, Father of the House of Commons.
- Edward Lyons (1926–2010), Labour and Social Democratic Party MP for Bradford East and Bradford West.
- Hyman Morris (1873–1955), magistrate, Lord Mayor of Leeds 1941–42.
- Jeremy Raisman (1892–1978), administrator in the government of British India.
- Bert Ramelson (1910–94), industrial organiser for the Communist Party of Great Britain.
- Moses Sclare (1867–1949), secretary of the Leeds Jewish Tailors', Machinists' and Pressers' Union.
- Alex Sobel (born 1975), Labour MP for Leeds North West, shadow Minister for Nature, Water and Flooding.
- Martha Steinitz (1889–1966), pacifist, Berlin secretary of War Resisters' International.
- Joshua Solomon Walsh (1902–84), Lord Mayor of Leeds 1966–7.

=== Community leaders ===
- Joshua Abelson (1873–1940), minister of the Leeds Great synagogue, writer on Jewish Mysticism.
- Albert Chait (born 1986), Rabbi, recognized in 2022 New Year's Honours for services to the Jewish Community and to charity in West Yorkshire.
- Yitzhak HaLevi Herzog (1888–1959), first Chief Rabbi of Ireland, Ashkenazi Chief Rabbi of Mandatory Palestine, and first Chief Rabbi of Israel.
- Yehuda Refson (1946–2020), Rabbi, head of the Leeds Beth din.
- Meir Rekhavi (born 1962), founder and first chancellor of Karaite Jewish University, Hakham of Karaite Jews of Europe, member of the Karaite Religious Council in Israel.
- Pat Solk (1924–2008), charity volunteer, President of Age Concern Leeds, chair of Leeds Council for Voluntary Service and Leeds Eastern Health Authority.
- Arthur Saul Super (1908–79), Rabbi, wartime Army chaplain, chief editorial writer of The Jerusalem Post.

=== Military ===
- Julius Diamond (1896–1917), Lieutenant 7th Squadron of the Royal Flying Corps, awarded the Military Cross for conspicuous gallantry.
- Walter Lubelski (1886–1919), awarded the Military Cross for service in World War I.
- Jack White (1896–1949), awarded the Victoria Cross "for most conspicuous bravery and resource".

=== Holocaust witnesses and refugees ===
- Eugene Black (1928–2016). When he was a teenager, his family was murdered in Auschwitz. Surviving slave-labour in a V-2 rocket factory, and a forced march to Belsen, post-war he was a Marks & Spencers manager. In the 1990s he talked in schools."
- Lilian Black (1951–2020) she became chair of the Holocaust Survivors' Friendship Association and helped set up the Holocaust Exhibition and Learning Centre.
- Liesel Carter (born 1935) She escaped from Germany age four, unaccompanied, via Sweden and Norway, to a foster family in Leeds, and began to tell her story from 2005.
- John Chillag (1927–2009) Raised in Hungary, he survived Auschwitz, where many of his relatives were murdered, and a forced march to Buchenwald. In Leeds from 1962, he published his memoirs, and spoke to 25,000 young people.
- Ruth Grant (born 1928 Cologne) was five when the Nazis confiscated the family home and business. Witnessing the aftermath of Kristallnacht, she followed her brother to England, with a place on a Kindertransport. She has published her life-story.
- Leslie Hardman (1913–2008) minister at Chapeltown synagogue, as an Army chaplain entered Belsen in 1945. He supervised the burial of an estimated 20,000 victims. Broadcasting and writing thereafter he was an early Holocaust educator.
- Arek Hersh (born 1928) is a Leeds-based Holocaust educator, who survived the Łódz ghetto, four camps including Auschwitz, and a death march. He was one of the Windermere Children.
- Joseph Henry Levey (1881–1970) A veteran of the Boer War and WW1, on the eve of WW2 in 1939 he lobbied to evacuate Berlin's ORT School. Marching in his kilt into SS headquarters, saving many staff and students, he re-established and oversaw the school in Leeds.
- Martin Kapel (born 1930) experienced Nazism in Leipzig; expelled by the SS into Poland in the forest at night, he lived in an impoverished Hasidic community soon to be eradicated. After the Kindertransport and the Coventry Blitz, he heard that his mother alone remained of the extended family. He is a Holocaust educator.
- Helena Kennedy (1912–2006) A Budapest dressmaker, apprenticed at Paris' House of Chanel, she sewed for the orchestra in Auschwitz, and after a winter march to Belsen, for Nazi women.
- Iby Knill (1923–2022) was liberated from Auschwitz in 1945, and settled in Leeds, working for the Home Office. She gave talks and published her life story. Her name is one of those featured on the sculpture Ribbons, unveiled in 2024.
- David Makofski (1892–1973) was wounded in World-War I; in the 1930s he organised immigration and found work for refugees to Leeds, as chairman of the Leeds Jewish Refuge Committee.
- Rudi Leavor (1926–2021). Brought to Shipley from Germany in 1937, Rudi qualified at Leeds in dentistry. Cantor, Bradford Reform Synagogue Life President, 50-year member Leeds Philharmonic Choir, composer of cantatas, champion of Inter-faith relations, and Berlin Jewish Museum, he was also a Holocaust educator.
- Judith Rhodes (born 1953) of Leeds made a film and gives talks, in the UK and Germany, about her mother Ursula Michel's experiences, including the Kindertransport.
- Suzanne Ripton (born 1936) who lives in Leeds, hid during the war in Paris, into 1947, finding she had lost her parents in Auschwitz. She has shared her experiences.
- Trude Silman (born 1929) fled age nine before the Nazis invaded Czechoslovakia. She lives in Leeds, where for many years she ran the Holocaust Survivors Fellowship Association, and is now its Life President.
- Marguerite Simmons (born 1906), and son John Muller (born c. 1928) met Hitler in 1934.
- Ernst Simon (born 1930) experienced Kristallnacht, and arrived from Austria on the Kindertransport in 1939, followed by his family. He has been recognized for services to Holocaust Education.
- Heinz Skyte (1920–2020) was a refugee from Nazi Germany who pioneered the concept of sheltered housing in Leeds. Founder-chairman of the Holocaust Survivors Friendship Association, he frequently talked in schools.

=== Sports ===
- Manny Cussins (1905–87) furniture magnate and philanthropist, chaired Leeds United 1972–83.
- Les Gaunt (1918–1985, aka Les Goldberg) Born in Leeds (Chapeltown), he played as Right Back for Leeds United FC from the 1930s, with two England Schoolboy caps, and returned from war service in India. After 33 appearances, he left for Reading FC in 1947. He changed his name by deed poll to Les Gaunt
- Gerald Krasner (born 1949), an insolvency accountant and Leeds United-fan, became chairman and led the 2004 financial rescue of the club; thereafter he was a specialist in managing imminent football bankruptcies.
- Wilf Rosenberg (1934–2019), a South African Rugby Union international, made 81 appearances for Leeds RLFC, helping the club to its first championship 1960–1.
- Bernard Shooman (born 1935) is a former Rugby League referee.

=== Physicians ===
- Saul Adler (1895–1966) was son to a Russian Rabbi in Leeds, studying medicine locally. As a wartime army doctor in Mesopotamia, after Liverpool School of Tropical Medicine, he became the world authority on Leishmaniasis, Professor at the Hebrew University of Jerusalem 1928–55.
- Major Myer Coplans (1879–1961). Demonstrator in bacteriology and public health at Leeds University, research on contamination and purification led him, in the First World War, to command the first mobile hygiene laboratory, with effective typhoid prevention in the field, and multiple European honours.
- Max Hamilton (1912–88) became Professor of Psychiatry at Leeds 1963–77; a pioneer in psychometrics, the Hamilton Depression and Anxiety Scales are used worldwide.
- Augusta Landman (1893–1966) Born in Leeds as Augusta Umanski, she was the first woman to qualify from Leeds Medical School, and later a pioneer of family planning and marriage guidance in London.
- Monty Losowsky (1931–2020) led the establishment of Europe's largest teaching hospital, St James's in Leeds. He qualified at Leeds, returning to be its specialist in liver disease and a professor of medicine and later Dean of the medical school.
- Ivor Meyer Quest (1928–93) a GP from Liverpool, became senior Police Surgeon in Leeds, and helped develop the Medical Protection Society.
- James Shapiro (born Leeds 1962) is a Canadian liver and pancreas surgeon known for the Edmonton protocol transplant for diabetes. Professor at the University of Alberta, among his awards are Hunterian Professorship at the Royal College of Surgeons.
- Alan Silman (born 1951) is an epidemiologist and rheumatologist, professor of Musculoskeletal Health at Oxford University. He chairs Appeal Panels for NICE and edits major textbooks.
- Arnold Sorsby (1900–80) was Polish-born, studied medicine at Leeds in 1929, to become a noted eye surgeon, geneticist and Government advisor.
- Maurice Sorsby (1898–1949) a physician at Leeds (1927), published widely, and organised pre-war medical relief for victims of Nazism.
- Moses Umanski (1862–1936) was a Russian army doctor who moved to Berlin, London and then Leeds (1892–1930), where he became superintendent of the Herzl-Moser hospital (1905–26). He founded the Leeds Hebrew Literary Society, the Leeds Zionist Association, in 1899 the English Zionist Federation, and the Zionist paper Dos Volk.
- Kurt Zinnemann (1908–88) Dismissed from his medical post by the Nazis, interrogated and imprisoned in Moscow, interned on the Isle of Man, he settled in Leeds, to become Professor of Bacteriology, world expert on Haemophilus infection, and leader in medical teaching.

=== Lawyers ===
- Sue Baker, senior Magistrate.
- Stanley Berwin (1926–88), lawyer, founder of firms Berwin & Co and SJ Berwin, director at NM Rothschild bank, deputy chairman at British Land.
- Barrington Black (born 1932), member of the Supreme Court of Gibraltar.
- Arthur Sigismund Diamond (1897–1978), Master of the Supreme Court.
- John Dyson, Lord Dyson (born 1943), Justice of the Supreme Court of the United Kingdom.
- Neil Franklin (born 1948), longest-serving Chief Crown Prosecutor for England up to 2011.
- Martin Goldman (born 1964), Chief Crown Prosecutor for North-West England.
- Alter Max Hurwitz (1889–1970), barrister named in the Nazi black book of 1940.
- Jerry Pearlman (1933–2018), solicitor, national Vice President of the Ramblers, advocate for the right to roam.
- Julius Stone (1907–1985), international law professor in Australia.
- Marilyn Stowe (born 1957), lawyer specialising in family law.

=== Other professionals ===
- Basil Gillinson (1925–2001) studied at Leeds School of Architecture, and ran a practice in Leeds known for the Merrion Centre in Leeds, and many other landmark UK modernist leisure facilities.
- Joe Glucksmann (1912–70) headmaster of Woodhouse County Secondary School, and honorary life officer of Beth Hamedrash Hagad synagogue was recognized in the Queen's 1966 birthday honours.

=== Academics ===
- Zygmunt Bauman (1925–2017) was a sociologist and philosopher, driven out by the 1968 Polish purge, who became Professor of Sociology at Leeds, later emeritus. Bauman wrote on modernity and the Holocaust, postmodern consumerism, globalisation and morality. The University of Leeds established the Bauman Institute in his honour.
- Jeremy Baumberg (born 1967), is Professor of Nanoscience at Cambridge University's Cavendish Laboratory, Director of the Nanophotonics Centre, and also a science broadcaster. His awards include the Faraday Medal.
- Simon Baumberg (1940–2007) was professor of bacterial genetics at Leeds University, and among many roles, chair of the Medical Research Council Advisory Board; he was also an active participant in local Jewish communal life.
- Selig Brodetsky (1888–1954) was a Russian-born Professor of Mathematics at Leeds 1924–48, a leading member of the World Zionist Organization, the president of the Board of Deputies of British Jews, and the second president of the Hebrew University of Jerusalem.
- Geoffrey Cantor (born 1943) is professor emeritus of the history of science at the Centre for Jewish Studies at Leeds, an expert on Judaism and 19th-century science.
- Julius B. Cohen (1859–1935) was born in Manchester; in Leeds from 1885 he was Professor of Organic chemistry 1904–24. As well as authoring organic chemistry textbooks, he campaigned against air pollution.
- Frank Felsenstein (born 1944, London) of the Leeds Centre for Jewish Studies, previously Reader in 18th century studies 1971–98 at Leeds.
- Eugene Grebenik (1919–2001) An expert on demography and professor of social studies at Leeds University 1954–70, he was the first principal of the Civil Service College, and president of the British Society for Population Studies.
- Erika Harris Her Slovak parents survived Auschwitz and Sachsenhausen. She is an academic expert in European nationalism. She studied at Leeds University and became Professor of Politics at Liverpool University.
- Benedikt Isserlin (1916–2005) son of famous Munich psychiatrist Max Isserlin, headed the Department of Semitic Studies at Leeds University, where he worked for 30 years. An archaeologist and linguist, he excavated in North Africa and the Far East, including the Phoenician site in Motya.
- Ernst Walter Kellermann (1915–2012) Born to a Berlin Rabbi, he graduated in Vienna and escaped to England. He made a contribution to the Theory of Solids, before at Leeds from 1949, he led important work on cosmic rays (often out on the Pennines). He was involved in University administration, the Leeds Reform Jewish community, and the Fabian Society.
- Hyam Maccoby (1924–2004), scholar of Jewish and Christian tradition, was grandson of the Kamenitzer Maggid. After war service librarian of Leo Baeck College, London, in retirement he joined the Centre for Jewish Studies, Leeds. He viewed Jesus as a mainstream Jewish messiah claimant, executed by the Romans, with Christianity entirely founded by Paul, a Hellenist. He wrote the play and film The Disputation.
- Aryeh Newman (1924–2020) Born in Leeds, went to Cambridge, was an Israeli scholar, expert on Judaica and linguistics, also an ordained rabbi. After working at the Jewish Agency, he joined the Hebrew University of Jerusalem, and is known for translation of the writings of Nehama Leibowitz.
- Jonathan Newman is a filmmaker and writer, trained at the Northern Film School in Leeds, whose work includes the critically acclaimed Foster, winner Best Feature film at the Rhode Island Film Festival.
- Griselda Pollock (born 1949) came to Leeds in 1997, professor of social and critical art history, and Director of the Centre for Cultural Analysis, Theory and History at Leeds University.
- Jay Prosser (born 1966) is reader in humanities at the University of Leeds, winner of the 2020 Rowley Prize for Empire's Loving Strangers, a biography that explores his Jewish family's experiences and connections across empires and centuries.
- Geoffrey Raisman (1939–2017), born to a Leeds tailor who worked for Burton's, attended Roundhay School, went to Oxford. He was a neuroscientist, who demonstrated the plasticity of nerve synapses and the mechanisms of nerve regeneration.
- Philip Saffman FRS (1931–2008) born in Leeds, educated at Roundhay Grammar School, studied at Cambridge, was a mathematician eventually at the California Institute of Technology; he was a world-leading figure in fluid mechanics and vortex dynamics.
- David A. Shapiro (born 1945), Professor of Psychology at Leeds University 1995–2006, son of Monte Shapiro, led the Sheffield-Leeds Psychotherapy Research Programme.
- Max Silverman (born c. 1957 London) is Professor of French, and Director of Research at Leeds School of Modern Languages since 2011. At Leeds since 1986, his interests cover contemporary French society, including post-Holocaust culture, and race and memory.
- Johanna Stiebert (born c. 1970 New Zealand), is Professor of Hebrew Bible at Leeds University.
- Geoffrey Wigoder (1922–99) born in Leeds, editor of the Encyclopaedia Judaica, professor, columnist and international broadcaster from Israel, writer on archaeology, and an advocate of Jewish-Christian dialogue.

=== Community historians ===
- James Appell (born Leeds 1984), now a New York sports journalist, he has written about the Jews of Leeds, Britain and Eastern Europe.
- Joseph Buckman (born Leeds 1926) wrote about the politics of the class struggle amongst the Jews of Leeds.
- Murray Freedman (1928–2011) A Leeds dentist, he became a chronicler of his community, publishing extensively, with an MA at Leeds University. He was Leeds president of the Jewish Historical Society.
- Ernest Krausz (1931–2018) was son of a Leeds Rabbi, who conducted a pioneering survey on the Jews of Leeds. He became an Israeli Professor of Sociology, and Rector at Bar Ilan University.
- Aubrey Newman (1927–2005) was a Leeds-based academic historian, whose work includes Anglo-Jewry and the Holocaust.
- Louis Saipe (1896–1984) was a local Jewish historian in Leeds, and authored the play "They came to Leeds" around 1950.
