= List of copper alloys =

Metal alloy with copper as its principal component

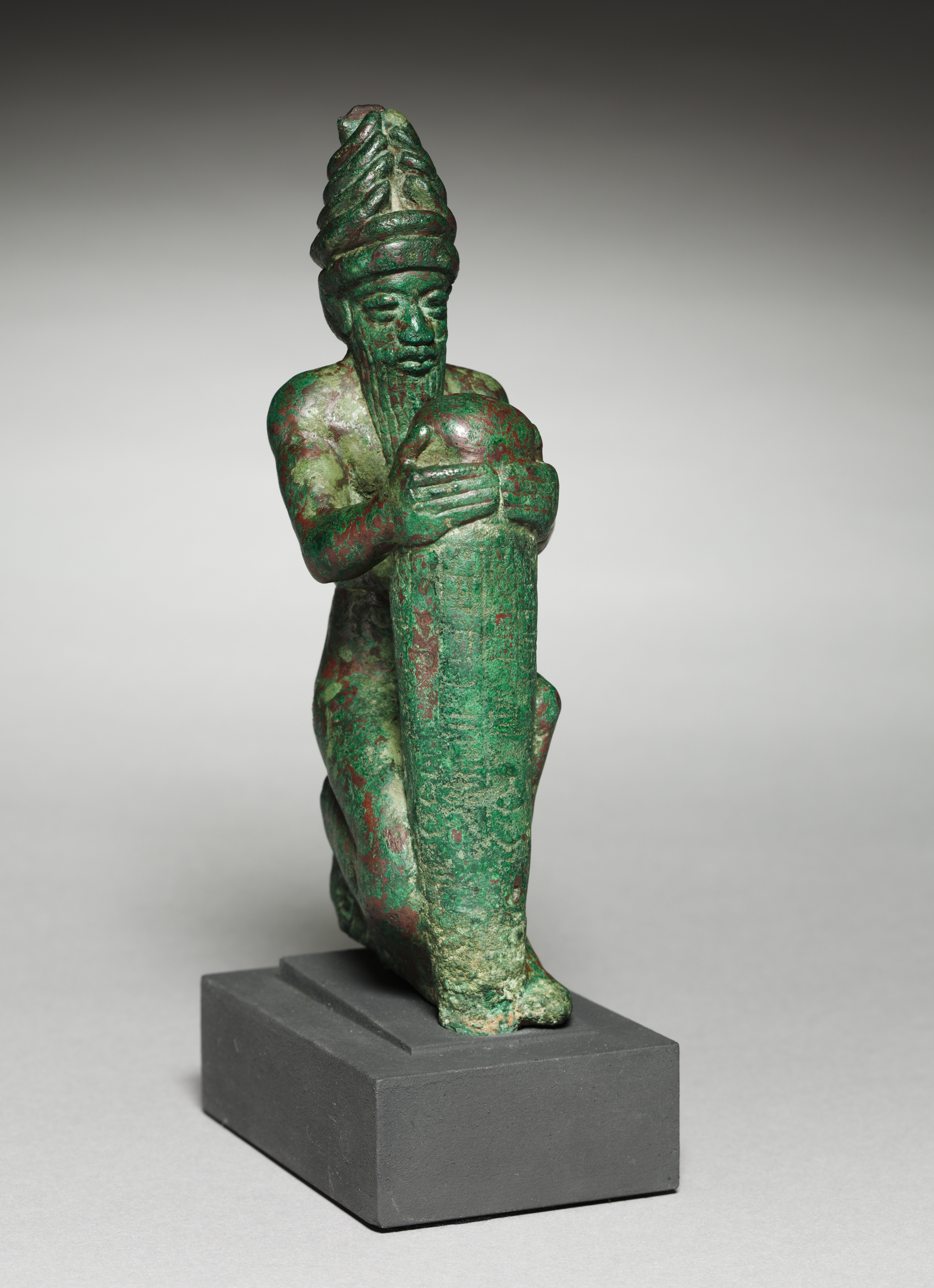
Example of a copper alloy object: a Neo-Sumerian foundation figure of Gudea, circa 2100 BC, made in the lost-wax cast method, overall: 17.5 x 4.5 x 7.3 cm, probably from modern-day Iraq, now in the Cleveland Museum of Art (Cleveland, Ohio, USA)

Copper alloys are metal alloys that have copper as their principal component. They have high resistance against corrosion. Of the large number of different types, the best known traditional types are bronze, where tin is a significant addition, and brass, using zinc instead. Both of these are imprecise terms. Latten is a further term, mostly used for coins with a very high copper content. Today the term "copper alloy" tends to be substituted for all of these, especially by museums.

Copper deposits are abundant in most parts of the world (globally 70 parts per million), and it has therefore always been a relatively cheap metal. By contrast, tin is relatively rare (2 parts per million), and in Europe and the Mediterranean region, even in prehistoric times, it had to be traded considerable distances and was expensive, sometimes virtually unobtainable. Zinc is even more common at 75 parts per million but is harder to extract from its ores. Bronze with the ideal percentage of tin was therefore expensive, and the proportion of tin was often reduced to save cost. The discovery and exploitation of the Bolivian tin belt in the 19th century made tin far cheaper, although forecasts for future supplies are less positive.

There are as many as 400 different copper and copper alloy compositions loosely grouped into the categories: copper, high copper alloy, brasses, bronzes, cupronickel, copper–nickel–zinc (nickel silver), leaded copper, and special alloys.

== Composition ==
The similarity in external appearance of the various alloys, along with the different combinations of elements used when making each alloy, can lead to confusion when categorizing the different compositions. The following table lists the principal alloying element for four of the more common types used in modern industry, along with the name for each type. Historical types, such as those that characterize the Bronze Age, are vaguer, as the mixtures were generally variable.

Classification of copper and its alloys
Family	Principal alloying element	UNS numbers
Copper alloys, brass	Zinc (Zn)	C1xxxx–C4xxxx,C66400–C69800
Phosphor bronze	Tin (Sn)	C5xxxx
Aluminium bronzes	Aluminium (Al)	C60600–C64200
Silicon bronzes	Silicon (Si)	C64700–C66100
Cupronickel, nickel silvers	Nickel (Ni)	C7xxxx

Mechanical properties of common copper alloys
Name	Nominal composition (percentages)	Form and condition	Yield strength (0.2% offset, ksi)	Tensile strength (ksi)	Elongation in 2 inches (percent)	Hardness (Brinell scale)	Comments
Copper (ASTM B1, B2, B3, B152, B124, R133)	Cu 99.9	Annealed	10	32	45	42	Electrical equipment, roofing, screens
Copper (ASTM B1, B2, B3, B152, B124, R133)	Cu 99.9	Cold-drawn	40	45	15	90	Electrical equipment, roofing, screens
Copper (ASTM B1, B2, B3, B152, B124, R133)	Cu 99.9	Cold-rolled	40	46	5	100	Electrical equipment, roofing, screens
Gilding metal (ASTM B36)	Cu 95.0, Zn 5.0	Cold-rolled	50	56	5	114	Coins, bullet jackets
Cartridge brass (ASTM B14, B19, B36, B134, B135)	Cu 70.0, Zn 30.0	Cold-rolled	63	76	8	155	Good for cold-working; radiators, hardware, electrical, drawn cartridge cases.
Phosphor bronze (ASTM B103, B139, B159)	Cu 89.75, Sn 10.0, P 0.25	Spring temper	—	122	4	241	High fatigue-strength and spring qualities
Yellow or High brass (ASTM B36, B134, B135)	Cu 65.0, Zn 35.0	Annealed	18	48	60	55	Good corrosion resistance
Yellow or High brass (ASTM B36, B134, B135)	Cu 65.0, Zn 35.0	Cold-drawn	55	70	15	115	Good corrosion resistance
Yellow or High brass (ASTM B36, B134, B135)	Cu 65.0, Zn 35.0	Cold-rolled (HT)	60	74	10	180	Good corrosion resistance
Manganese bronze (ASTM 138)	Cu 58.5, Zn 39.2, Fe 1.0, Sn 1.0, Mn 0.3	Annealed	30	60	30	95	Forgings
Manganese bronze (ASTM 138)	Cu 58.5, Zn 39.2, Fe 1.0, Sn 1.0, Mn 0.3	Cold-drawn	50	80	20	180	Forgings
Naval brass (ASTM B21)	Cu 60.0, Zn 39.25, Sn 0.75	Annealed	22	56	40	90	Resistance to salt corrosion
Naval brass (ASTM B21)	Cu 60.0, Zn 39.25, Sn 0.75	Cold-drawn	40	65	35	150	Resistance to salt corrosion
Muntz metal (ASTM B111)	Cu 60.0, Zn 40.0	Annealed	20	54	45	80	Condenser tubes
Aluminium bronze (ASTM B169 alloy A, B124, B150)	Cu 92.0, Al 8.0	Annealed	25	70	60	80	—
Aluminium bronze (ASTM B169 alloy A, B124, B150)	Cu 92.0, Al 8.0	Hard	65	105	7	210	—
Beryllium copper (ASTM B194, B196, B197)	Cu 97.75, Be 2.0, Co or Ni 0.25	Annealed, solution-treated	32	70	45	B60 (Rockwell)	Electrical, valves, pumps, oilfield tools, aerospace landing gears, robotic welding, mold making
Beryllium copper (ASTM B194, B196, B197)	Cu 97.75, Be 2.0, Co or Ni 0.25	Cold-rolled	104	110	5	B81 (Rockwell)	Electrical, valves, pumps, oilfield tools, aerospace landing gears, robotic welding, mold making
Free-cutting brass	Cu 62.0, Zn 35.5, Pb 2.5	Cold-drawn	44	70	18	B80 (Rockwell)	Screws, nuts, gears, keys
Nickel silver (ASTM B122)	Cu 65.0, Zn 17.0, Ni 18.0	Annealed	25	58	40	70	Hardware
Nickel silver (ASTM B122)	Cu 65.0, Zn 17.0, Ni 18.0	Cold-rolled	70	85	4	170	Hardware
Nickel silver (ASTM B149)	Cu 76.5, Ni 12.5, Pb 9.0, Sn 2.0	Cast	18	35	15	55	Easy to machine; ornaments, plumbing
Cupronickel (ASTM B111, B171)	Cu 88.35, Ni 10.0, Fe 1.25, Mn 0.4	Annealed	22	44	45	–	Condenser, salt-water pipes
Cupronickel (ASTM B111, B171)	Cu 88.35, Ni 10.0, Fe 1.25, Mn 0.4	Cold-drawn tube	57	60	15	–	Condenser, salt-water pipes
Cupronickel	Cu 70.0, Ni 30.0	Wrought	–	–	–	–	Heat-exchange equipment, valves
Ounce metal Copper alloy C83600 (also known as "Red brass" or "composition metal") (ASTM B62)	Cu 85.0, Zn 5.0, Pb 5.0, Sn 5.0	Cast	17	37	25	60	—
Gunmetal (known as "red brass" in US)	Varies Cu 80-90%, Zn <5%, Sn ~10%, +other elements@ <1%						

Mechanical properties of Copper Development Association (CDA) copper alloys
Family	CDA	Tensile strength [ksi]		Yield strength [ksi]		Elongation (typ.) [%]	Hardness [Brinell 10 mm-500 kg]	Machinability [YB = 100]
Family	CDA	Min.	Typ.	Min.	Typ.	Elongation (typ.) [%]	Hardness [Brinell 10 mm-500 kg]	Machinability [YB = 100]
Red brass	833		32		10	35	35	35
Red brass	836	30	37	14	17	30	50–65	84
Red brass	838	29	35	12	16	25	50–60	90
Semi-red brass	844	29	34	13	15	26	50–60	90
Semi-red brass	848	25	36	12	14	30	50–60	90
Manganese bronze	862	90	95	45	48	20	170–195^{†}	30
Manganese bronze	863	110	119	60	83	18	225^{†}	8
Manganese bronze	865	65	71	25	28	30	130^{†}	26
Tin bronze	903	40	45	18	21	30	60–75	30
Tin bronze	905	40	45	18	22	25	75	30
Tin bronze	907	35	44	18	22	20	80	20
Leaded tin bronze	922	34	40	16	20	30	60–72	42
Leaded tin bronze	923	36	40	16	20	25	60–75	42
Leaded tin bronze	926	40	44	18	20	30	65–80	40
Leaded tin bronze	927	35	42		21	20	77	45
High-leaded tin bronze	932	30	35	14	18	20	60–70	70
High-leaded tin bronze	934	25	32		16	20	55–65	70
High-leaded tin bronze	935	25	32	12	16	30	55–65	70
High-leaded tin bronze	936	33	30	16	21	15	79-83	80
High-leaded tin bronze	937	25	35	12	18	20	55–70	80
High-leaded tin bronze	938	25	30	14	16	18	50–60	80
High-leaded tin bronze	943	21	27		13	10	42–55	80
Aluminium bronze	952	65	80	25	27	35	110–140^{†}	50
Aluminium bronze	953	65	75	25	27	25	140^{†}	55
Aluminium bronze	954	75	85	30	35	18	140–170^{†}	60
Aluminium bronze	955	90	100	40	44	12	180–200^{†}	50
Aluminium bronze	958	85	95	35	38	25	150-170^{†}	50
Silicon bronze	878	80	83	30	37	29	115	40
^{†} Brinell scale with 3000 kg load

Comparison of copper alloy standards
Family	CDA	ASTM	SAE	SAE superseded	Federal	Military
Red brass	833					
Red brass	836	B145-836	836	40	QQ-C-390 (B5)	C-2229 Gr2
Red brass	838	B145-838	838		QQ-C-390 (B4)	
Semi-red brass	844	B145-844			QQ-C-390 (B2)	
Semi-red brass	848	B145-848			QQ-C-390 (B1)	
Manganese bronze	862	B147-862	862	430A	QQ-C-390 (C4)	C-2229 Gr9
Manganese bronze	863	B147-863	863	430B	QQ-C-390 (C7)	C-2229 Gr8
Manganese bronze	865	B147-865	865	43	QQ-C-390 (C3)	C-2229 Gr7
Tin bronze	903	B143-903	903	620	QQ-C-390 (D5)	C-2229 Gr1
Tin bronze	905	B143-905	905	62	QQ-C-390 (D6)	
Tin bronze	907		907	65		
Leaded tin bronze	922	B143-922	922	622	QQ-C-390 (D4)	B-16541
Leaded tin bronze	923	B143-923	923	621	QQ-C-390 (D3)	C-15345 Gr10
Leaded tin bronze	926		926			
Leaded tin bronze	927		927	63		
High-leaded tin bronze	932	B144-932	932	660	QQ-C-390 (E7)	C-15345 Gr12
High-leaded tin bronze	934				QQ-C-390 (E8)	C-22229 Gr3
High-leaded tin bronze	935	B144-935	935	66	QQ-C-390 (E9)	
High-leaded tin bronze	937	B144-937	937	64	QQ-C-390 (E10)	
High-leaded tin bronze	938	B144-938	938	67	QQ-C-390 (E6)	
High-leaded tin bronze	943	B144-943	943		QQ-C-390 (E1)	
Aluminium bronze	952	B148-952	952	68A	QQ-C-390 (G6)	C-22229 Gr5
Aluminium bronze	953	B148-953	953	68B	QQ-C-390 (G7)	
Aluminium bronze	954	B148-954	954		QQ-C-390 (G5)	C-15345 Gr13
Aluminium bronze	955	B148-955	955		QQ-C-390 (G3)	C-22229 Gr8
Aluminium bronze	958				QQ-C-390 (G8)	
Silicon bronze	878	B30	878			

The following table outlines the chemical composition of various grades of copper alloys.

Chemical composition of copper alloys
Family	CDA	AMS	UNS	Cu [%]	Sn [%]	Pb [%]	Zn [%]	Ni [%]	Fe [%]	Al [%]	Other [%]
Red brass	833		C83300	93	1.5	1.5	4				
Red brass			C83400	90			10				
Red brass	836	4855B	C83600	85	5	5	5				
Red brass	838		C83800	83	4	6	7				
Semi-red brass	844		C84400	81	3	7	9				
Semi-red brass	845		C84500	78	3	7	12				
Semi-red brass	848		C84800	76	3	6	15				
Manganese bronze			C86100	67	0.5		21		3	5	Mn 4
Manganese bronze	862^{†}		C86200	64			26		3	4	Mn 3
Manganese bronze	863^{†}	4862B	C86300	63			25		3	6	Mn 3
Manganese bronze	865	4860A	C86500	58	0.5		39.5		1	1	Mn 0.25
Tin bronze	903		C90300	88	8		4				
Tin bronze	905	4845D	C90500	88	10	0.3 max	2				
Tin bronze	907		C90700	89	11	0.5 max	0.5 max				
Leaded tin bronze	922		C92200	88	6	1.5	4.5				
Leaded tin bronze	923		C92300	87	8	1 max	4				
Leaded tin bronze	926	4846A	C92600	87	10	1	2				
Leaded tin bronze	927		C92700	88	10	2	0.7 max				
High-leaded tin bronze	932		C93200	83	7	7	3				
High-leaded tin bronze	934		C93400	84	8	8	0.7 max				
High-leaded tin bronze	935		C93500	85	5	9	1	0.5 max			
High-leaded tin bronze	937	4842A	C93700	80	10	10		0.7 max			
High-leaded tin bronze	938		C93800	78	7	15		0.75 max			
High-leaded tin bronze	943	4840A	C94300	70	5	25		0.7 max			
Aluminium bronze	952		C95200	88					3	9	
Aluminium bronze	953		C95200	89					1	10	
Aluminium bronze	954	4870B; 4872B	C95400	85					4	11	
Aluminium bronze			C95410	85					4	11	Ni 2
Aluminium bronze	955		C95500	81				4	4	11	
Aluminium bronze			C95600	91						7	Si 2
Aluminium bronze			C95700	75				2	3	8	Mn 12
Aluminium bronze	958		C95800	81				5	4	9	Mn 1
Silicon bronze			C87200	89							Si 4
Silicon bronze			C87400	83			14				Si 3
Silicon bronze			C87500	82			14				Si 4
Silicon bronze			C87600	90			5.5				Si 4.5
Silicon bronze	878		C87800	80			14				Si 4
Silicon bronze			C87900	65			34				Si 1
^{†} Chemical composition may vary to yield mechanical properties

== Brasses ==
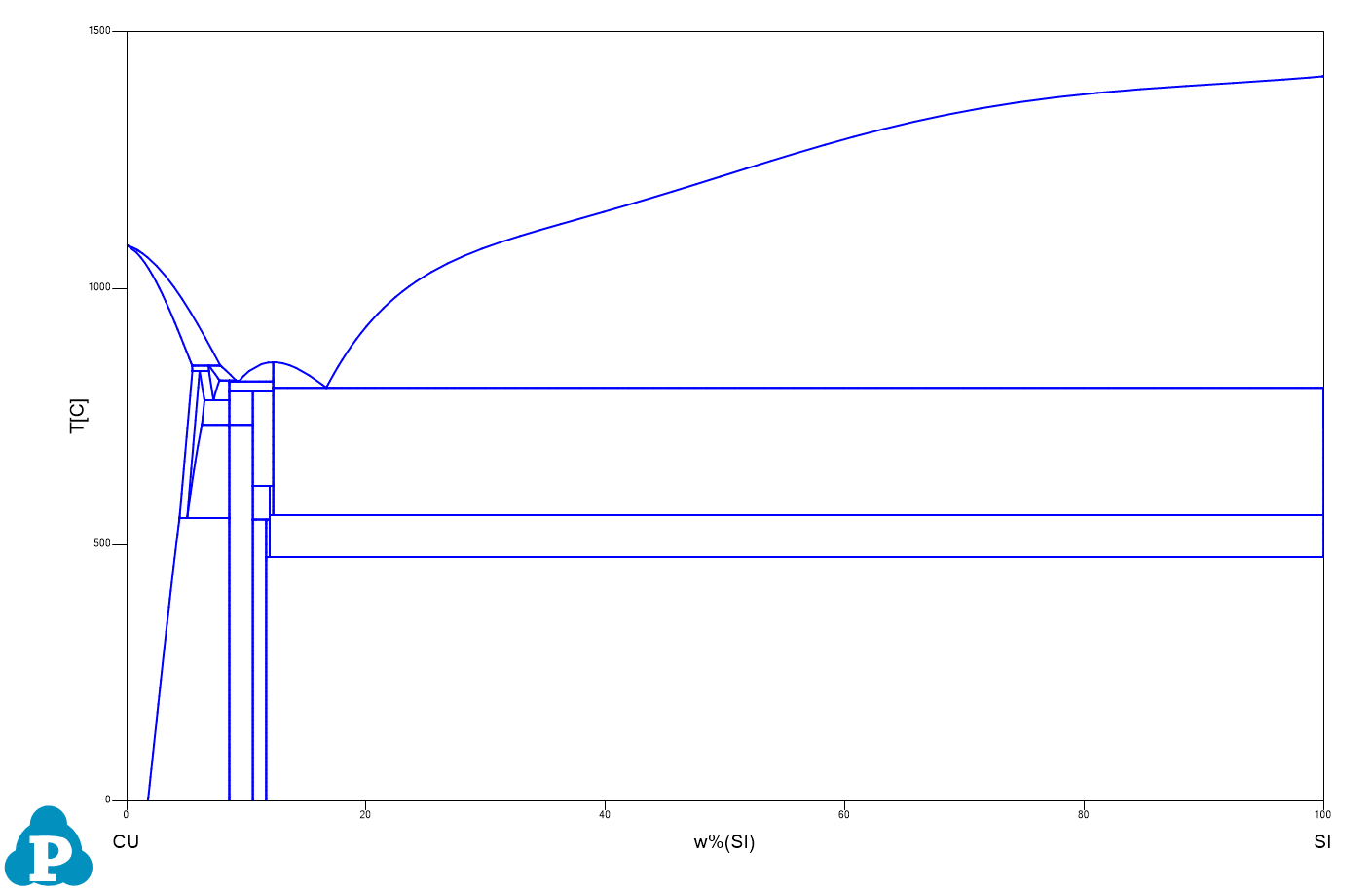
Binary Cu Si phase diagram, the base phase diagram for silicon bronzes

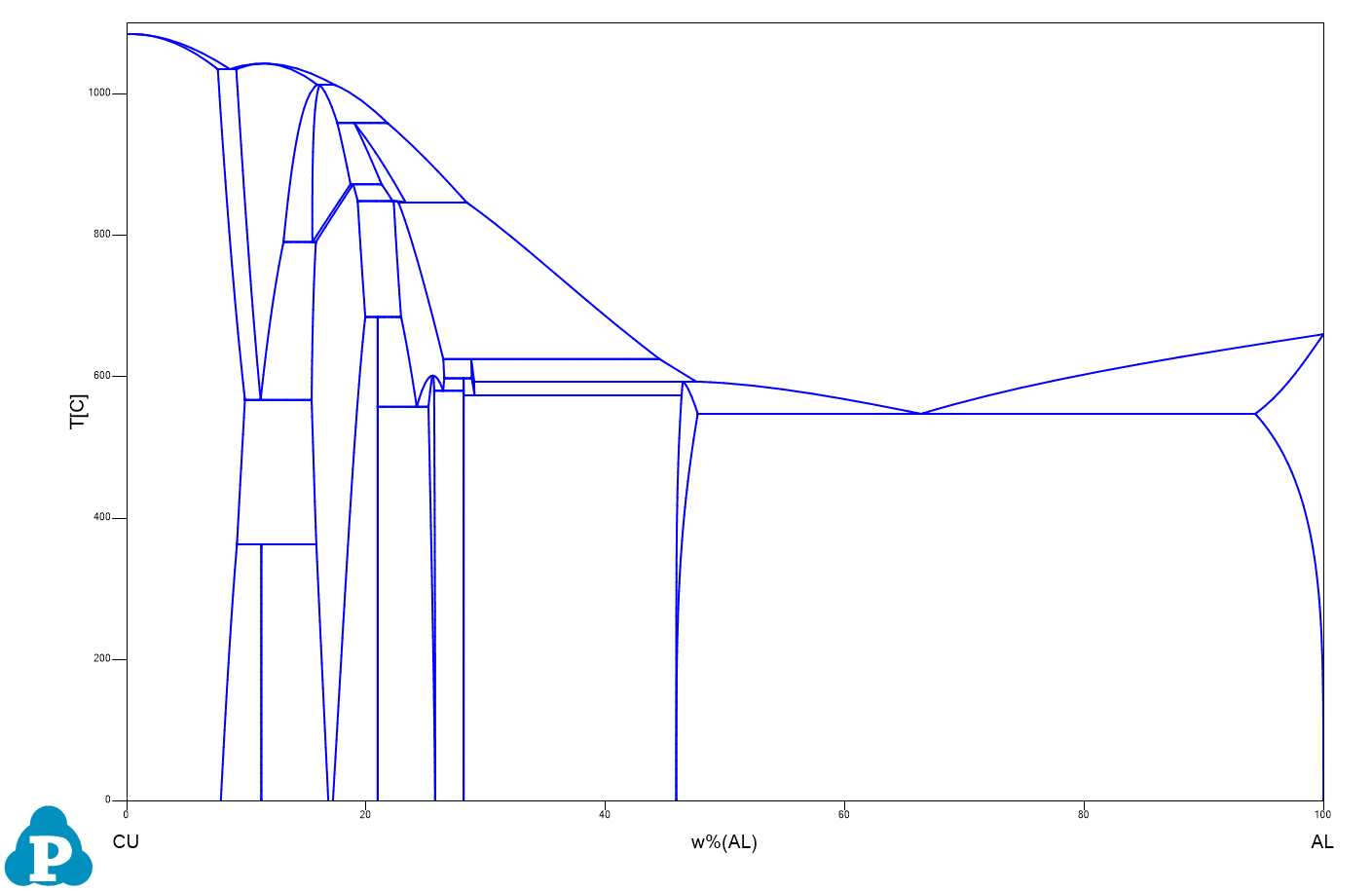
Binary Cu Al phase diagram, the base phase diagram for aluminium bronzes, generated using NIMS Open databases https://cpddb.nims.go.jp/cpddb/al-elem/alcu/alcu.htm - DOI https://doi.org/10.48505/nims.3060 and Computherm Pandat https://computherm.com/

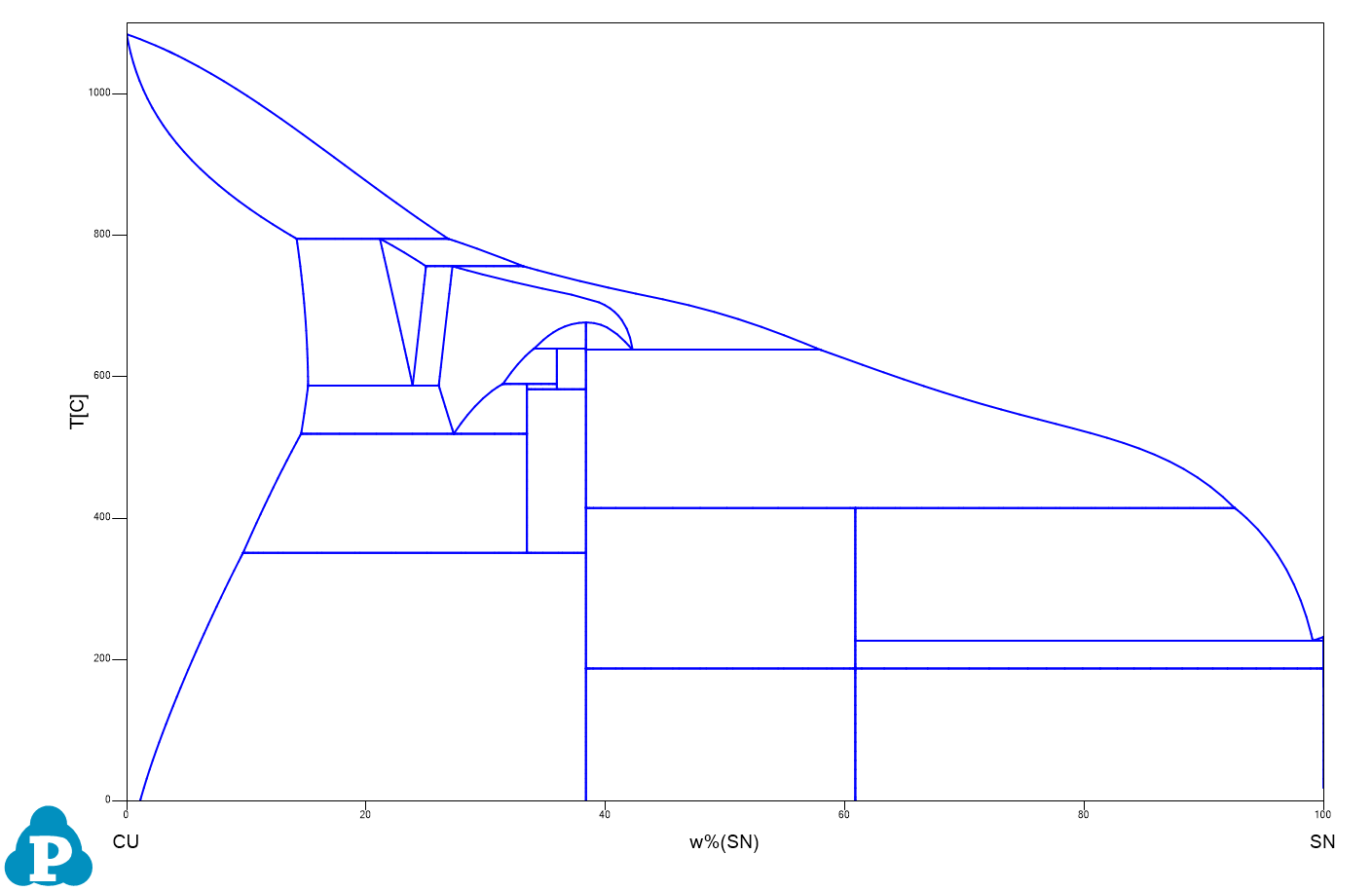
Binary Cu Sn phase diagram, the base phase diagram for bronzes, generated using NIMS Open databases https://cpddb.nims.go.jp/cpddb/cu-elem/cusn/cusn.htm - DOI https://doi.org/10.48505/nims.3060 and Computherm Pandat https://computherm.com/

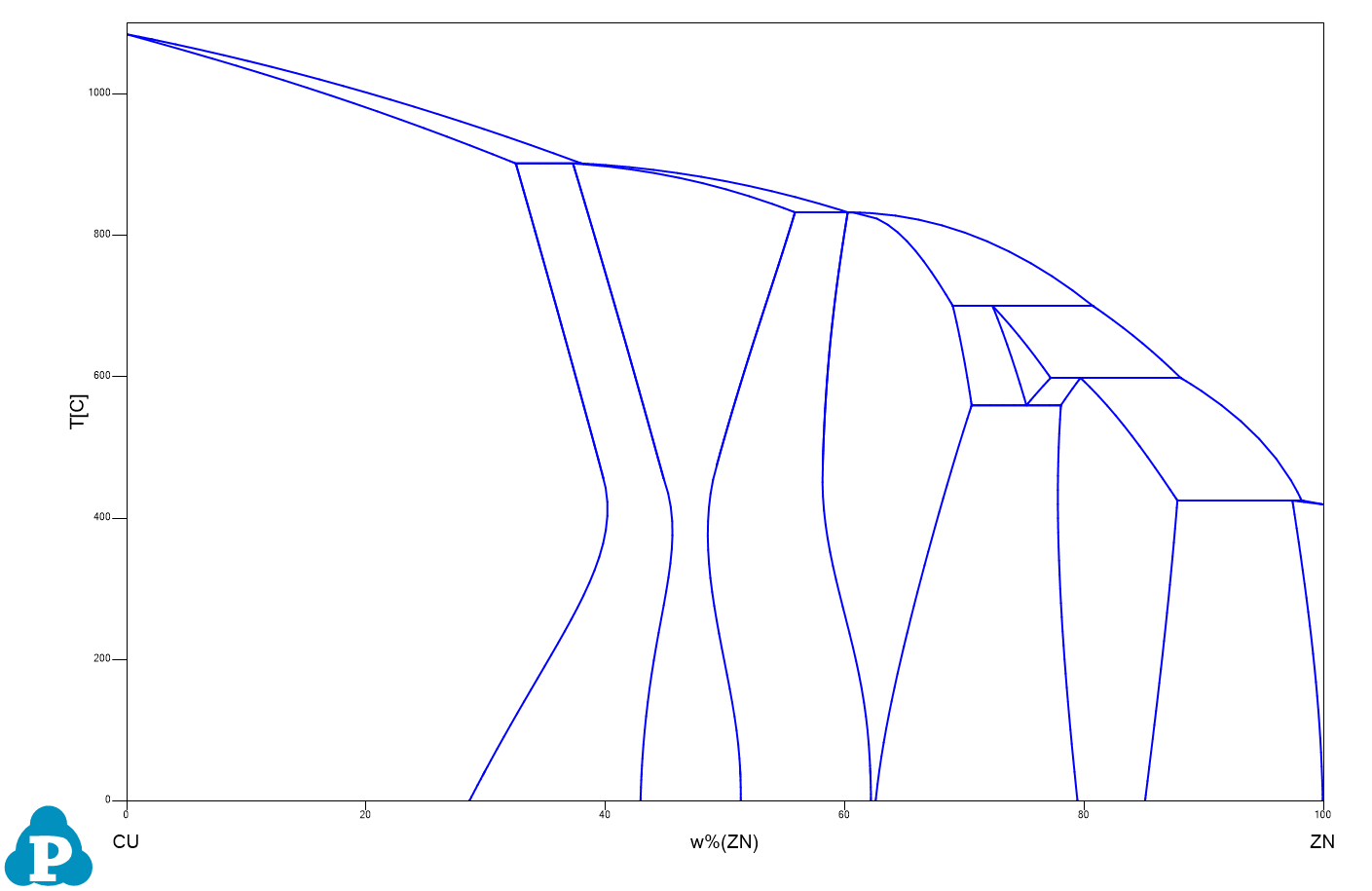
Binary Cu Zn phase diagram, the base phase diagram for brasses, generated using NIMS Open database https://cpddb.nims.go.jp/cpddb/cu-elem/cu_index.htm Cu-Zn - DOI https://doi.org/10.48505/nims.3060 and Computherm Pandat https://computherm.com/

Brass is an alloy of copper with zinc. Brasses are usually yellow in color. The zinc content can vary between few % to about 40%; as long as it is kept under 15%, it does not markedly decrease the corrosion resistance of copper.

Brasses can be sensitive to selective leaching corrosion under certain conditions, when zinc is leached from the alloy (dezincification), leaving behind a spongy copper structure.

- Nordic Gold

== Bronzes ==
A bronze is an alloy of copper and other metals, most often tin, but also aluminium and silicon.

- Aluminium bronzes are alloys of copper and aluminum. The content of aluminum ranges mostly between 5% and 11%. Iron, nickel, manganese and silicon are sometimes added. They have higher strength and corrosion resistance than other bronzes, especially in marine environments, and have low reactivity to sulfur compounds. Aluminum forms a thin passivation layer on the surface of the metal.
- Bell metal
- Brastil
- French bronze is a bronze typical to France in the later 19th century consisted of 91% copper, 2% tin, 6% zinc, and 1% lead. The term "French bronze" was also used for spelter, an alloy which is mainly zinc, but can be finished to resemble real bronze; its composition was typically 5 parts hematite powder to 8 parts lead oxide, formed into a paste with spirits of wine. Variations in tint could be obtained by varying the proportions. The preparation was applied to the article to be bronzed with a soft brush, then polished with a hard brush after it had dried.
- Phosphor bronze
- Nickel bronzes, e.g. nickel silver and cupronickel
- Speculum metal
- UNS C69100

== Precious metal alloys ==
Copper is often alloyed with precious metals like gold (Au) and silver (Ag).

Name	Cu [%]	Au [%]	Ag [%]	Other [%]
Auricupride	†	†		
Ashtadhatu	†	†	†	Fe†, Hg†, Sn†, Zn†
Billon	†		†	Hg†
Chinese silver	58		2	17.5 Zn, 11.5 Ni,
Corinthian bronze	†	†	†	
CuSil	28		72	
Dymalloy	20		80	C (type I diamond)
Electrum, Green gold	6-23	75-80	0-15	0-4 Cd
Grey gold	†	†		Mn†
Guanín	25	56	18	
Hepatizon	†	trace	trace	
Niello	†	†		Pb sulfides†
Panchaloha	†	†	†	Fe†, Sn†, Pb†, Zn†,
Rose, red, and pink gold	20-50	50-75	0-5	
Spangold	18-19	76		5-6 Al
Shakudō	90-96	4-10		
Shibuichi	40-77	0-1	23-60	
Tibetan silver	†		†	Ni†, Sn†
Tumbaga	3-97	3-97		
White gold	†	†		Ni†, Zn†

† amount unspecified

== High temperature copper alloys ==
Copper alloys that are resilient at high temperatures and maintain mechanical properties are used in many applications such as heat exchangers, castings, and rocket engines. Copper alloys typically have very high thermal conductivities compared to other structural alloys which give them an advantage when large heat fluxes are involved, as they are better at dissipating heat. But copper’s melting point is 1085 Celsius, which is lower than most structural alloys. Therefore, to make use of coppers excellent thermal properties at high temperatures, creep needs to be considered. Creep deformation occurs in materials at relatively high stresses and temperatures. It can dominate as a deformation mechanism in materials above ~0.35 of the melting temperature, so designing against it is critical for high temperature applications. The working temperatures of high temperature copper alloys are up to 700 Celsius. Most of the leading high temperature copper alloys rely on oxide dispersion strengthening (ODS) or precipitation hardening (PH). Some alloys use different methods however, such as alloy, GRCop-84, which takes advantage of intermetallic compounds that form, in its microstructure. These precipitates pin the grains and inhibit grain boundary sliding. The advantage of ODS strengthening is that the oxides will not coarsen during temperature aging while PH alloys will, and the strengthening will be lost. In all cases, the goal of the strengthening mechanisms are to slow down creep deformation, and the various mechanisms that contribute to it such as dislocation glide, dislocation glide, and vacancy diffusion. Some examples of how these strengthening mechanisms work are by increasing the activation energy needed for lattice and grain boundary diffusion, introducing a threshold stress needed to climb or shear particles in matrix, or by pinning grains which inhibits grain boundary sliding. Other factors to be considered at high temperature are oxidation and thermomechanical fatigue which may contribute material degradation.

== See also ==
- Copper-clad steel
- Copper alloys in aquaculture
- Antimicrobial copper-alloy touch surfaces
- Lubaloy C41100
