= David Makofski =

British humanitarian (1892–1974)

David Makofski (1892–1974) was an English, Leeds-based tailor and humanitarian. From 1938 to 1940 he helped at least 300 mainly Austrian and German Jews to flee Nazi persecution in their homeland.

== Life ==
Born in Leeds, to a Jewish family of Latvian immigrants to Britain, Makofski left school at 14 to become a tailor at the Leeds factory of Montague Burton. He fought for Britain in the First World War in the Royal Field Artillery. After the end of the First World War, and having suffered war injuries, Makofski frequently travelled to the Czechoslovak spa town of Karlovy Vary for treatment of his arthritis. There, he gained firsthand insight into the increasingly precarious situation faced by Jews in continental Europe and was asked by local Jewish residents for help in escaping the Nazi régime. Through this he developed a network of contacts in Germany and Austria.

The Jewish Refugees Committee was formed in London in 1933 to supervise the entry, accommodation and employment of Jewish refugees from Germany. In 1934 David Makofski became chairman of the Leeds branch of the Jewish Refugees Committee, previously called the Council for German Jewry. There were various restrictions imposed by the British government on arriving Jewish refugees from Germany and neighbouring countries, and some were at risk of being interned as enemy aliens. Makofski attended hearings of the Tribunal on Enemy Aliens at Leeds Town Hall, to lobby the tribunal's judges to avoid internment for individual Jewish refugees. One principle was that immigrants should impose no cost to the state, and had to pay £50 or £100 for their permit. Makofski established a trainee scheme to meet these restrictions and found himself travelling to London to obtain the permit from the Home Office that would allow the refugees to enter Britain. Under this programme, more than 300 Austrian and German Jews under the age of 35 found employment in mostly Jewish owned businesses in and around Leeds. Makofski and his clerk Vera noted down every person they helped and kept all correspondence that they held with the refugees and other aid committees.

Makofski handled extensive administration, securing work permits, and worked hard to secure accommodation and the significant funding needed for the permits, through Jewish, Quaker, and wider community networks. There were sensitivities about whether refugees would take jobs from local Leeds people and Makofski made it clear in interviews with journalists that there were a number of strict conditions regarding the trainee scheme, that it wasn't taking jobs away from those who were unemployed, and that wages were at subsistence level. The permit system for trainees was intended to be of temporary duration, and many of those on the scheme left Britain to go to other countries.

The German-born Canadian solo violinist Gerhard Kander, who died in 2008, was able to flee Germany via Makofski's trainee scheme before emigrating to Canada. Makofski had arranged sponsorship for his violin training. In common with other survivors, Kander avoided talking about his wartime experiences, to the extent that Kander's wife was unaware of how he escaped Nazi Germany until after his death.

Not all refugees who were placed in Leeds had positive experiences, with one future writer, C.C. Aronsfeld, who had escaped from Poland, describing a fraught relationship with Makofski, though without directly naming him. This attracted a strongly worded reply from another Leeds refugee, who said that Makofski had given countless hours to supporting Jewish refugees.

Makofski died in 1974.

== Legacy ==
Makofski's son, Geoffrey McKay, gave the files of his father to the West Yorkshire Archives in July 2002, where they have since been stored as the Makofski Papers under the reference number WYL5047. The collection contains a big "Trainee Book" which is the composite of the entries of two smaller Trainee Books. A typical entry contains the entry date to the UK, name, place of living in Leeds, date of birth, last place of residence before coming to the UK, employer in Leeds, occupation, date of arrival, and further information such as their last employment in Germany. Some entries contain photos of the refugees.

Further files are held at the Wiener Holocaust Library in London, including copies of Makofski's correspondence, much of which focused on the plight of individual refugees. Mike Levy, a historian who has studied Makofski's files, described him as an unsung hero: "He was determined to save as many young Jewish men from Nazi persecution as he could. There must be hundreds if not thousands alive today thanks to the dogged determination of this quiet man, largely forgotten by history."

== See also ==
- History of the Jews in Leeds
- Jewish refugees from German-occupied Europe in the United Kingdom
- Kindertransport
- Otto Schiff (humanitarian)
