= Albert Chait =

Rabbi Albert Sebastian Chait
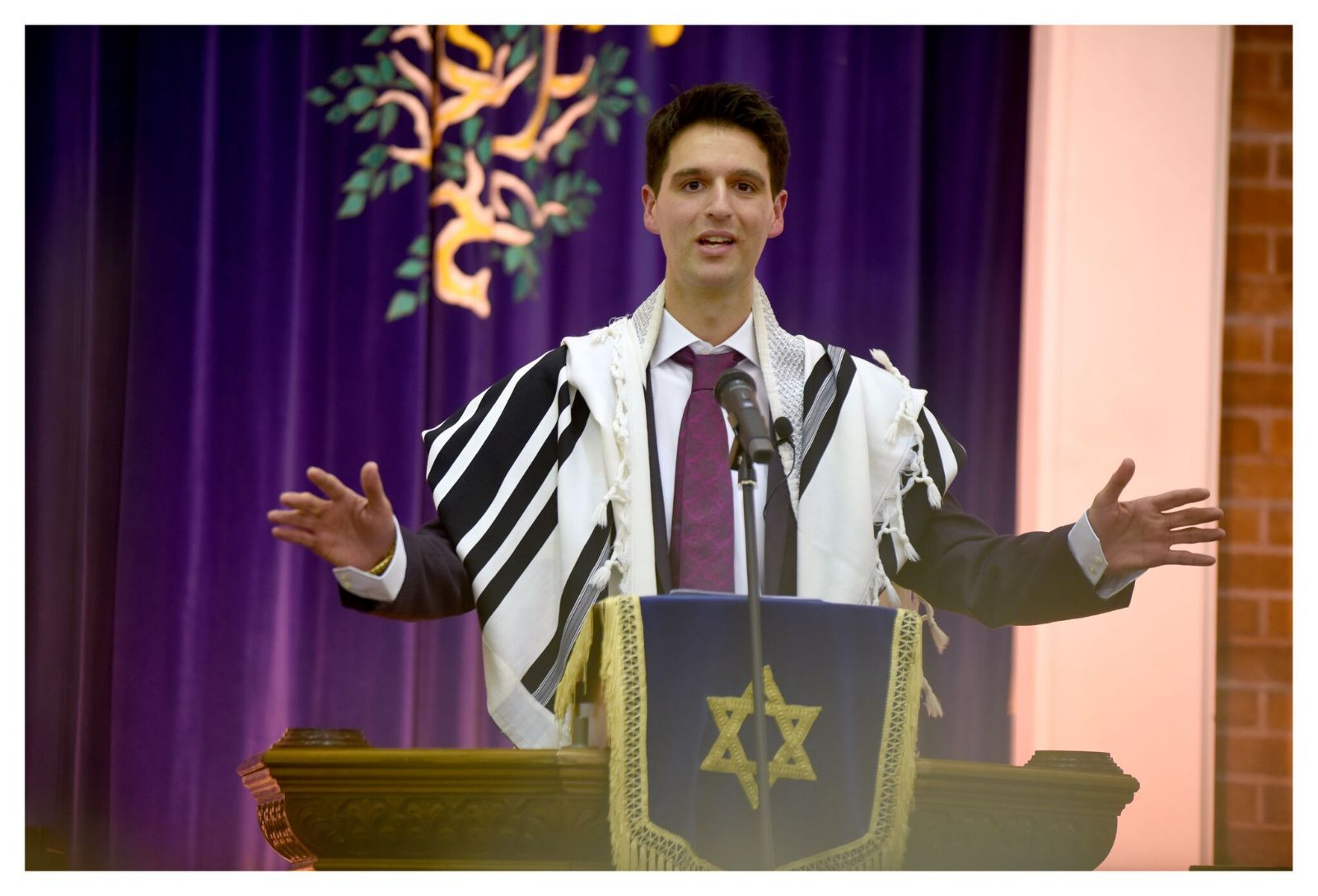
- Rabbi Albert Chait MBE, 2018

Senior Rabbi at the United Hebrew Congregation, Leeds
- Incumbent
- Assumed office 2005

Jewish Chaplain at the Leeds Teaching Hospitals NHS Trust
- Incumbent
- Assumed office 2005

Personal details
- Born: February 26, 1986 (age 40) Tarrytown, New York, U.S.
- Education: Yeshiva University (BA, JD, PhD)
- Alma mater: Bar-Ilan University (PhD)
- Occupation: Rabbi, Talmudic Scholar, Author
- Known for: Expertise in Jewish Law and Ethics
- Website: UHC Shadwell Lane

Rabbi Albert Sebastian Chait MBE (born 26 February 1986) is an Orthodox Rabbi, Cantor, and Senior Rabbi to the United Hebrew Congregation in Leeds, United Kingdom. As a prominent younger Rabbi, his community service, talks and singing have a notable online presence, as well as in traditional national media.

== Personal and early life ==
Known by all as "Alby", he was born in Liverpool, son of Helena Chait and Rev. Henry Mark Chait, Cantor to the Southport Hebrew Congregation and later the Greenbank Congregation in Liverpool. He attended Manchester Jewish Grammar School, moving in 2004 to the Midrash Shmuel Yeshiva in Jerusalem.

Chait supports Liverpool FC.

== Career ==
Tutored by his father in cantorial music and ministerial duties, Chait first led services age 14. At 19 he was appointed in Leeds, where he is now Senior Rabbi to the United Hebrew Congregation, the largest UK congregation outside London, as well as Jewish Chaplain to Leeds Teaching Hospital NHS Trust.

Chait has led varied initiatives, such as in Holocaust Education, and supporting healthcare workers. With a notably high impact online especially during the pandemic, in January 2022 he was awarded MBE by Queen Elizabeth II for service to the Jewish community.
