= Harris Sumrie =

Men's fashion pioneer

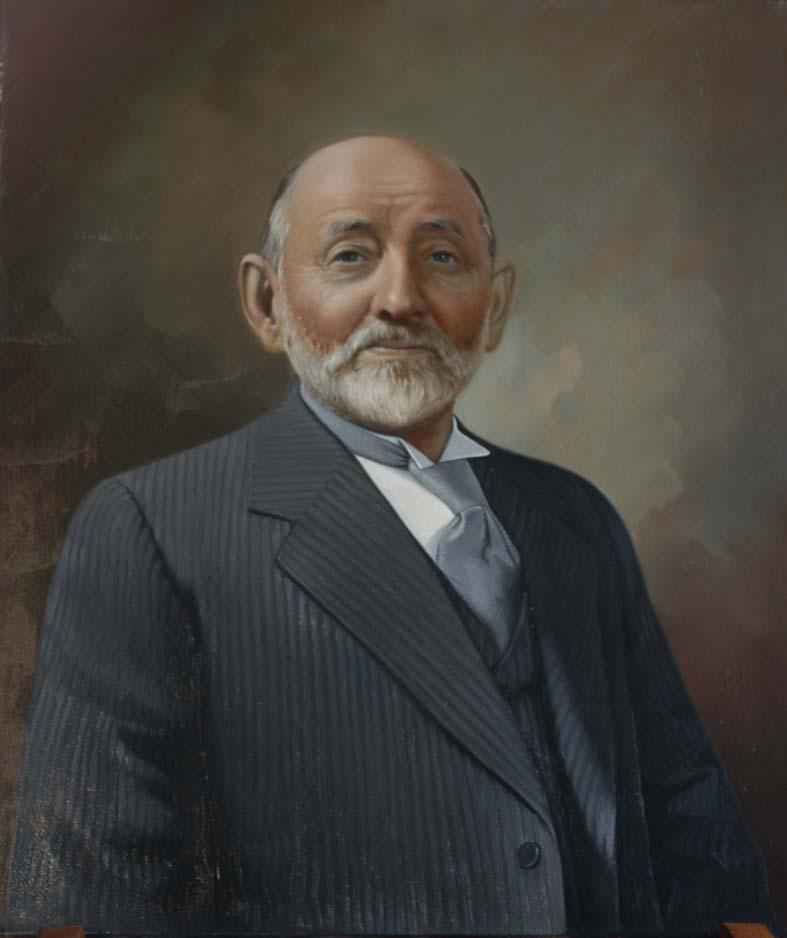
- Unknown artist, Harris Sumrie, c. 1930, Leeds Industrial Museum at Armley Mills
- Born: 1866; Głowno, Congress Poland
- Died: 1951; Leeds
- Resting place: United Hebrew Congregation Cemetery, Gildersome
- Occupation: Textile manufacturer
- Organization(s): C. and M. Sumrie Ltd

Harris Sumrie (1866–1951) was a Polish, Jewish immigrant who founded the pioneering men's fashion textile company, C. and M. Sumrie Ltd, in Leeds in 1891. Harris was a skilled tailor who foresaw the potential of providing high-class male tailoring to a mass market eager for clothing that had aesthetic appeal. He founded a company specializing in the production of high-class ready-to-wear clothing and bespoke tailoring. To do this, he developed a process for creating garments in 100 different sizes. He is credited with providing the first ready-to-wear garment to the London market, and establishing Leeds as the leading center of ready-to-wear fashion. Throughout its history, Sumries was known for producing good quality clothes for the gentleman of taste.

== Early life ==
Harris was born in Głowno, Congress Poland, Russian Empire in May 1866, to Myer and Rebecca Sumrie. He began in the textile trade as a boy and arrived as a journeyman in Leeds in 1886. He and his wife, Malka Tulinsky (b.1860 Poland-1926), known as Mary, were listed in Leeds as Russian nationals, despite being proud of their Polish identity. Their first child, Maurice, was born in Russia in 1885. Their other children were all born in Leeds, Carl Saul (b. 1891), Esther (b. 1894), and Charles (b. 1896).

== Textile Company ==
In 1911, Harris was operating out of a bay-windowed house in Exmouth Grove, Leeds, as a coat maker and tailor. By 1919, he employed around 35 people. During World War I, the business grew rapidly under Harris and his sons, and in 1921, it moved to new premises, a two-story building, on Woerth Place, Camp Road. The firm employed 250 people. In 1922, they trademarked their 'welcut' clothing line. In 1924, another factory was opened at Stamford Works, Cross Stamford Street, where a further 300 people were employed. In 1932, the business became a private company.

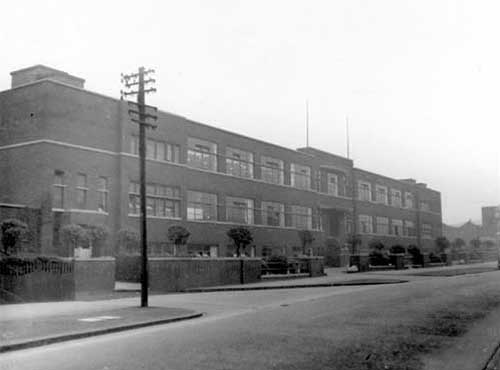
Sumrie House in 1937, York Road, Leeds

In May 1934, a new factory, called Sumrie House on York Road, was opened by the Lord mayor of Leeds, Mr A. E. Wilkinson. The architect was Mr C. Castelow. The architecture was noted for its dignified appearance, with a south-front using sand-faced bricks and horizontal lines, coloured steel window frames, an entrance hall lined with marble, and spacious, well-lit and brightly colored interiors. This architecture was seen as a reflection of the changing face of Leeds industries, from smoke-laden and cramped factories, to a modern, clean appearance. The planning of the machinery was supervised by the consulting engineer, Mr. J. Edwin Storr, including a special layout of steam boilers and steam pipes for process work and heating, electric lifts, and individual motor drives on benches to keep walkways clear. The sewing machines were supplied by The Bellow Machine Co. and the pressing machines were Hoffman Presses, made by Isaac Braithwaite & Son of Kendal and Leeds. There was also a canteen with steam, gas and electric units; the latest system of telephone communications between departments; and an innovative stock room to store garments. Messrs Mason and Co. were responsible for installing the showroom, clad with Australian walnut and tungum, with north-facing windows for good light, and display cases featuring garments for the season ahead.

At the opening ceremony in May 1934, the chairman presented a check for £250 to the Leeds General Infirmary Appeal and £100 to the German Fund. The business now employed 1,300 people, a rapid increase noted at the 1934 opening ceremony.

At Sumrie House, there were a team of designers working on perfecting garment fit and also the garments' appearance. Seventy models were employed to provide garments in seventy different sizes. The firm exported its goods around the world, particularly to Australia, South Africa and Europe. Stamford Works was retained for the production of boys' clothing, later moving to Lovell Road.

In the 1930s, the firm employed the advertising slogan 'Sumrie clothes are good', which continued to be used in the 1950s. They also developed 'Sumgrip', hip-fastening flannels, in competition with Simpson Daks.

== Legacy ==
Harris died on 30 September 1951 and is buried in the United Hebrew Congregation cemetery in Gildersome. In his will, he left £4,796 5s 5d to his sons Carl Saul and Charles Sumrie. Harris's sons continued to grow the family business. In 1957, Sumrie suits were advertised as being sold at Robinson & Cleaver and at Selfridges. In 1958, they acquired the Ledux brand of women's suits and coats. In 1967, the company sponsored a golf event at Hollinwell course, Nottingham, with a prizes totaling £6,000. In the 1980s, the company moved from Sumrie House, which was later demolished, and taken over by Executex.

Harris was featured in the exhibition, Leeds to Innovation (26 October 2019 – 26 September 2020), at Leeds Industrial Museum at Armley Mills.
