= Aryeh Newman =

Israeli scholar (1924–2021)

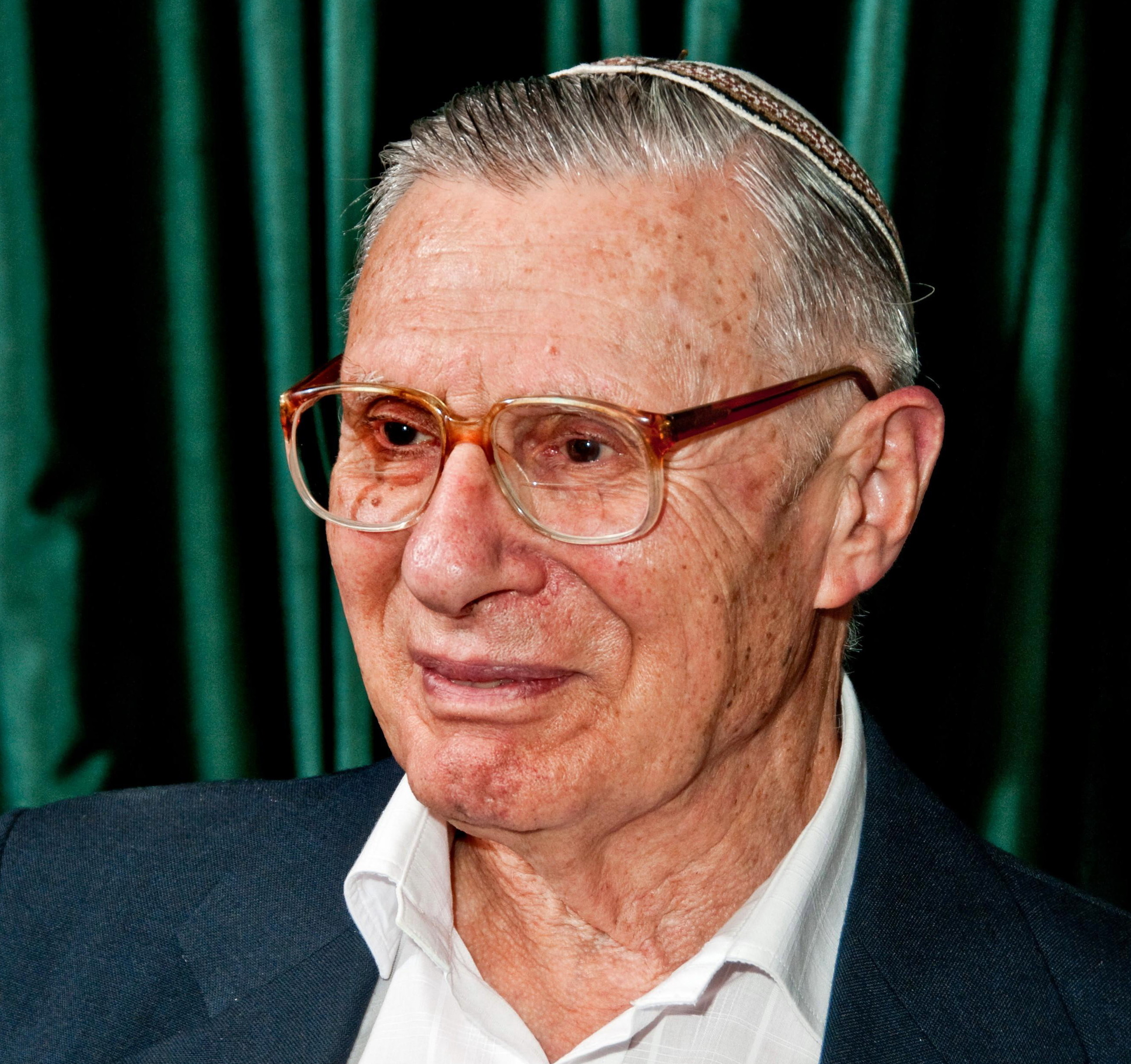

Aryeh Newman (Hebrew: אריה ניומן; born Leonard Newman, 1924 – 20 October 2021) was an Israeli scholar and an expert on Judaica and linguistics. He was a Cambridge University alumnus and an ordained rabbi. He worked many years at the Jewish Agency of the World Zionist Organization, and served as a Senior Lecturer and Head of Department of English as a Foreign Language at the Hebrew University of Jerusalem. Newman conducted extensive research and teaching in the field of linguistics, and was known for his translation and adaptation of the writings of Nehama Leibowitz.

== Early life ==
Newman was born in Leeds, England in 1924, to a religious Zionist family. His father, Simon (Noach) Newman, was a prominent building contractor in Leeds. He received a secular education along with extensive Jewish and Talmudic studies.

In January 1941, Newman won a scholarship to study English Literature at Emmanuel College at Cambridge University, where he graduated with honours and obtained his master's degree. His tutor was the literary scholar Joan Bennett.

During his academic studies, Newman became an ordained rabbi at the age of 19 under the aegis of Rabbi K. Kahana Kagan of Fitzwilliam after graduating from Jews' College London as well as Gateshead Talmudical College where he studied under Rabbis Eliyahu Eliezer Dessler and Leib Lopian.

Newman was also heavily involved in the Jewish Student Union while at Cambridge University and became president of the Jewish Society having succeeded the late Chaim Herzog who later became the President of Israel.

In 1949, following the declaration of the State of Israel, Newman emigrated to Israel with his wife, the late Manchester-born novelist Renée Crane Newman, and their two children; they subsequently had two further children who were born in Israel.

== Career ==
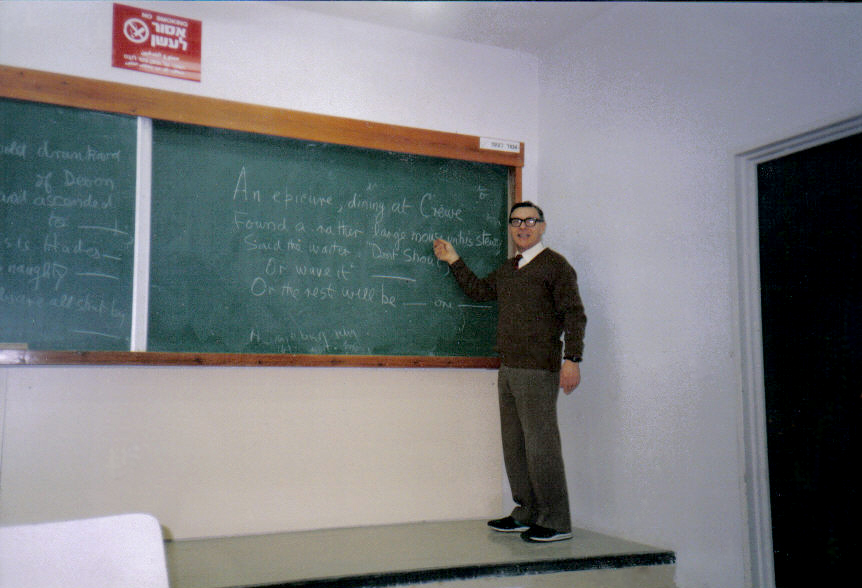
Aryeh Newman teaching at Hebrew University, 1970s

In the 1950s, Newman worked as a night editor at The Jerusalem Post and as the Editor of The Zionist Newsletter. Newman was also the producer and broadcaster of English radio programs in Kol Zion Lagolah that were focused on the Anglo-Jewish Diaspora.

Later he became the director of English educational programs in the Department for Religious Education and Culture at the Jewish Agency.

In 1962, Newman was appointed as the Jewish cultural officer in Australia and New Zealand's Jewish communities, where he founded the Yavneh College Primary School in Melbourne.

Newman later returned to Cambridge University as a research fellow in the Department of Linguistics, and received a Post-graduate diploma in the field of General and Applied Linguistics. He thereafter completed his doctoral thesis in linguistics, which was later published in a book by Acco Leuven (Belgium): Academic Publishing Company.

In 1981, Newman became a Senior Lecturer and head of Department of English as a Foreign Language at the Hebrew University of Jerusalem. During his career at the Jewish Agency and at the Hebrew University, Newman had various books and articles published on Judaism, Zionism, Jewish Education, State and Religion issues and Linguistics. In addition, he translated, edited and adapted the works of Nehama Leibowitz's Studies in the Pentateuch.

Newman contributed to Encyclopaedia Judaica, The Jewish Encyclopedia, Encyclopedia of Judaism, Encyclopedia of Zionism, The Oxford Dictionary of the Jewish Religion and Encyclopedia of Language and Linguistics. Newman has also had articles published in Congress Weekly – A Review of Jewish Interests, The Reconstructionist, The American Zionist, Jewish Heritage and The Jewish Horizon.

Newman served as a visiting professor at the Linguistics Department of St. Andrews University, Scotland, at Berkeley Comparative Literature and Linguistics Departments, at SUNY Binghamton Translation Research and Instruction Programme, and at the Australian Universities of Monash and Macquarie, and the Australian National University.

== Linguistic approaches ==
Newman's approach to translation was a holistic and contextual approach that included the historical and cultural background of the source and target text, as well as the structural differences between the source and target languages. Newman saw the importance of using various models to provide insight regarding translation equivalence involving sound, syntax, semantics and pragmatics. He believed translation is more of an art than a science.

== Personal life ==
Newman died in Israel on 20 October 2021, at the age of 97.

== Published works ==
=== Editing and Translating ===
- Six Talks on Maimonides. Jerusalem 1955, 44p. + 12p. (Hebrew)
- Mayanot, Jewish Teachers Companion, 4 Vols. 1956 pp. 171; 1960 pp. 173; 1963 pp. 170; 1967 pp. 290.
- Sabbath Chapters of Talmud, Tractate Shabbat of Babylonian Talmud. Selected Chapters with Translation notes and questions. 1972 pp. 156.
- Studies in the Pentateuch of Nehama Leibowitz. English Adaptation in 5 vols. 1973–1980 pp. 2520.
- The Ben Sira Scroll from Massada by Y. Yadin. 1965. Jerusalem. Israel Exploration Society and Shrine of the Book.

=== Original articles and publications ===
- "Yom Ha'atzmaut – a new festival in the making", Judaism, 6 (1957), pp. 219–223.
- "Zvi Hirsch Kalischer – Father of the Third Return to Zion", Tradition, Fall 1962, pp. 76–89.
- "When a Jew is not a Jew", Orthodox Jewish Life, Vol. xxx, no.3/March–April 1963.
- "Hillel and Shammai", Jewish Spectator, 29,2 (1964), pp. 23–26.
- "The Sabbatical Year – Yesterday and Today", Tradition, Vol. 7 No. 3, Fall 1965, pp. 57–65.
- "Some Reflections on religion and politics in Israel", Niv Hamidrashia, Winter 1965, English Section, pp. 15–21.
- "The post mortem impasse in Israel", Jewish Life, 34,1 (1966), pp. 27–30.
- "Spotlight on Halitzah in Israel", Jewish Life, 34,4 (1967), pp. 18–22.
- "The Centrality of Eretz Yisrael in Nachmanides", Tradition, vol. 10:1 (1968), pp. 21–30.
- "The Judaic conception of filial piety", Yavneh Review, 7 (1969), pp. 69–91.
- "Teaching and Translating Talmud Today" 1972. World Zionist Organisation.
- "A Semantic Analysis of Hebrew and English Cooking Terms". Lingua. 37 1975.
- "Componential Analysis and Functional Ambiguity Equivalence: Translating Exodus 32, 17–18". Babel, Volume 21, Issue 1, Jan 1975. pp. 29–35.
- "Gen.2.2. An Exercise in Interpretive Competence and Performance". Technical Papers for the Bible Translator, 1976.
- "Evaluating Bible Translations". Forum 1978.
- "Semantic Mapping of a Text". Meta University of Montreal. 1978.
- "Linguistic Issues in a Talmudic Debate". Tradition 1980. 18/3.
- Mapping Translation Equivalence. no. 8 Contrastive Analysis Series, Acco Leuven 1980 pp. 142. ISBN 90 334 0142 8
- "Hebrew Verbs of Dress: Semantics and Collocation in a Contrastive Setting", Proceedings XIIIth International Congress of Linguistics, August 29 – September 4, 1982, Tokyo.
- "Jewish Identity: Cambridge 1941–1944". The Cambridge Review, vol. 10, no. 2276, Oct. 1983.
- Translation Universals: "Perspectives and Explorations" in Translation Perspectives III Selected Papers 1985-86 SUNY Binghamton. 1987, pp. 69–83.
- "From Exile to exit: the Frankau Jewish Connection", The Jewish Quarterly, Vol. 34 No. 4 (128), 1987.
- "The Contrastive Analysis of Hebrew and English Dress and Cooking Collocations: Some Linguistic and Pedagogic Parameters". Applied Linguistics, vol. 9, no. 3. O.U.P. 1988. pp. 293–305.
- "Translation Equivalence: Nature". R.E. Asher ed. pp 4694–4700 in Encyclopedia of Language and Linguistics (1994), Oxford Pergamon Press Ltd.
- "Reason and Dogma: Debate Between Secular and Orthodox Jewishness". The Jewish Quarterly, Vol. 41 No. 2 (154), 1994.
- "The Oral and Written Interface: Some Talmudic Evidence", Language and Communication vol. 16, issue 2, April 1996 pp. 153–164.
- "RaSHI in the Perspective of Postmodern Interpretive Strategies". Jewish Affairs, Spring 1996, pp. 21–26.
- "Women, Saints, and Heretics in Maimonides: The Challenge of Translating Judaica", Conservative Judaism, 49:2 (Winter 1997), pp. 74–84.]
- "Modern Orthodoxy – The Debate Continues", Le'ela, 45 (33–37) 1998.
- "Jewish Consensus or Doctrinal Divide?", Midstream, May–June 1998.
- "Islamic Mythmaking and the Arab-Israel Conflict". Midstream. Vol. 48, no. 6. September–October 2002. pp. 16–17 – via Questia.
- "The Case for a Humanist Orthodoxy", Jewish Affairs, Winter 2002, pp. 21–25.
- "Talmudic Norms: Use and Abuse", Jewish Affairs, Pesach 2014, pp. 44–45.

=== Articles published in the Brooklyn Jewish Center Review ===
- "A Dilemma in Israel", August–September 1952
- "The Spirit of the Israel Army", January 1953
- "Compulsory Service for Women", August–September 1953.
- "The Voice of Zion", March 1954
- "The Significance of Shavuot", April 1956
- "An Encyclopedia of Talmudic Law", February 1957
- "A Lost Tribe Returns", March 1957
- "Religious Contributors to Israeli Literature", June 1957
- "Israel's Druzes", December 1957
- "The Story of the Ingathering", March 1958
- "The Destruction of the Temple", June 1959
- "The Seven Hanukkahs", December 1960
