= Lubaloy C41100 =

Copper alloy

C41100 Lubaloy is a wrought copper alloy that is composed mainly of copper and zinc. Lubaloy possesses many favorable characteristics making it, and other types of brass, a popular choice in manufacturing. It is a source material in many processes including the creation of electrical components and bullet-making. There are both positive and negative health effects that are associated with the use of this material.

Lubaloy is made from combining 91% copper, 8.5% zinc, and 0.5% tin. Proportional variances are utilized for application specific demands of each desired material component. The range of compositions can vary from around 81 to 95% copper, 3 to 18% zinc, and 0.5 to 2% tin. A common variation of the Lubaloy alloy type in Lubaloy X 425, with a composition of 88% copper, 10% zinc, and 2% tin.

== History ==
Documented use of brass dates back to early Romans.

In 1922, the Western Cartridge Company introduced a copper-washed bullet jacketing called Lubaloy which stands for lubricating alloy. Lubaloy replaced standard bullet jacketing which had been gilding metal, cupro-nickel coated steel or solid cupro-nickel. The original jacketing was found to be detrimental to magnum cartridge firearm performance over time. Lumps of the hot jacketing were deposited near the end of the barrel during firing, eventually creating a hazard or destroying the barrel. The problem was solved in the UK, where Kynoch developed a new kind of brass similar to gilding metal with a little tin alloyed which became a breakthrough solution to this persistent dilemma, branded Nobeloy due to merge of the company into the Nobel Industries conglomerate. It was composed of 90% copper, 8% zinc, and 2% tin and was licensed to the WCC under the name of Lubaloy or Lubaloy-Palma.

Lubaloy can be fabricated using blanking, forming, and drawing processes. The early versions of brass were created by co-smelting mixed ores. The process was called cementation, which involved heating zinc and copper in a closed crucible with charcoal. This dates back to the 7th century BC in Greece. Sometimes the zinc ore was pre-heated to produce metallic zinc which condensed from the hot vapour. This was called speltering. It produced a superior product where the purity can be controlled and modified. This process was noted from around 1000 AD in India. Today full-scale production is more stream-lined; modern smelters and electrolytic refineries are used.

Brass has also been mentioned in the Bible.

== Uses ==
This alloy is widely used because it is soft and more malleable than copper or zinc alone. It offers great cold workability and hot formability. The non-ferromagnetic property of brass allows it to be easily separated from other metals. It is tarnish-resistant, and has low friction and spark-less qualities. It is dull yellow and has an appearance similar to that of gold. Brass is a substitutional alloy used for decorations and jewellery. Brass is an excellent electrical and thermal conductor because copper has a simple FCC crystal structure. Silver is the best electrical conductor. Copper can conduct 97% of the amount of electricity that silver can conduct.

Common uses include manufacture of rod, wire, sheet, and foil. Lubaloy is a component in such objects as trumpets and cymbals, doorknobs and locks, ammunition, valves, gears, and bearings. It is a common alloy used to make coins. This alloy plays an important role in manufacturing tools for use around explosive gases, and in cryogenics. It is used as a test control metal for protective coatings research. Other items include plates, tubes, pipes, forgings, castings, bushings, washers, terminals, connectors, flexible metal hose, and conductors.

== Health issues ==
Health concerns surrounding brass stem from lead contamination. Lead is sometimes added to enhance the machinability of brass. It is often present in concentrations around 2%. Thirteen key manufacturers were sued by the California state attorney general in October 1999. Lab tests revealed the average brass key contained more than the acceptable limit of lead. They were required to reduce the lead content to 1.5% after April 2001. By January 1, 2010, the California law states that brass containing less than 0.25% lead must be used for each component that comes into contact with the wetted surface of pipes, plumbing fittings and fixtures. On the other hand, the copper in brass does create a natural germicidal or oligodynamic effect. Brass doorknobs will virtually disinfect themselves within eight hours.

== Specifications ==
- Composition: 91% Copper, 8.5% Zinc, 0.5% Tin
- OLIN Alloy No. 411
- ASTM Spec. No. B591
- Density 0.318 Lbs. per cu In. at 68 °F( 27.68 = gms/cu cm at 20 °C)
- Modulus of elasticity x 106 PSI, tension (Kgf/mm2 = KSI x .7031) 16-18
- Electrical conductivity % IACS at 68 °F (20 °C) as annealed 28-32
- Thermal conductivity: 69-75 BTU • ft. @ 68°Fft2•hr•°F (20 °C)
- Coefficient of thermal expansion: Inches/inch/°F x 10-6from 68 °F to 572 °F (20 °C to 300 °C) 10.2

== Bibliography ==
- T. J. Shedlosky, A. Huovinen, D. Webster, G. Bierwagena. Development and Evaluation of Removable Protective Coatings on Bronze. National Museum of Australia, 2004.
- Fran Cverna. Thermal Properties of Metals. ASM International, 2002
- Günter Joseph, Konrad J. A. Kundig. Copper: Its Trade, Manufacture, Use, and Environmental Status. International Copper Association, 2010
- Hatcher, Julian (1957). Hatcher's Notebook: A Standard Reference Book for Shooters, Gunsmiths, Ballisticians, Historians, Hunters, and Collectors (2nd ed.). Harrisburg: Stackpole. OCLC 2397069.
- Non-Ferrous Alloys and Special Materials. ASM International, 1990
- Kirk-Othmer Encyclopedia of Chemical Technology. John Wiley, 1991
- Copper, UNS C41100, H10 Temper Flat Products. Automatic Creations Inc, 2010 http://www.matweb.com/search/DataSheet.aspx?MatGUID=2dae446f703344d58438ff478f25b81d
- Reroll Capabilities and Alloys / Brass. Technical Materials Inc, 2010 http://technicalmaterials.com/metal_prop/brass.html
- Jeffrey Scott Doyle. Bullet Basics 1–Materials. Firearms ID, 2007 http://firearmsid.com/Bullets/bullet1.htm
- Copper Alloy Guide. Olin Corporation, 1999 http://www.rjrpolymers.com/wp-content/uploads/alloyguide.pdf
