= CuSil =

Names
- Other names UNS P07720

Identifiers
CAS Number	12665-05-3

Properties
Chemical formula	Ag (71-73%) Cu (27-29%)
Appearance	Silvery metal
Density	10.0 g/cm^{3}
Melting point	780 °C (1,440 °F; 1,050 K)
Thermal conductivity	371 W/m.K
- Except where otherwise noted, data are given for materials in their standard state (at 25 °C [77 °F], 100 kPa). Infobox references

CuSil is a tradename for an alloy in the billon family of 72% silver and 28% copper (± 1%) marketed by Morgan Advanced Materials. It is a eutectic alloy primarily used for vacuum brazing. CuSil should not be confused with the similarly named Cusil-ABA, which has a different composition (Ag – 63.0%, Cu – 35.25%, Ti – 1.75%)
