= John Chillag =

Australian Holocaust survivor and author (1927–2009)

John Chillag (April 20, 1927 – March 21, 2009) was an Austrian Holocaust survivor and author. Born in Vienna, he fled with his family to Hungary in 1934 to avoid Nazi Germany's expanding sphere of influence, however during the German occupation of Hungary in 1944 he and his family were placed in a 5,000 strong Jewish ghetto in Győr, then taken to Auschwitz. Between 30 and 60 relatives died there, including his Czechoslovak-born mother, however he and his father were selected for manual labour and taken to Bochum to work for Bochumer Verein, a steel plant. His father died there in 1945, and Chillag was force-marched to Buchenwald concentration camp where he was liberated by the Allies two weeks later and given medical treatment.

Chillag emigrated to Australia after the war, having found no surviving family back in Hungary and being unable to remake the family business following the arrival of communism. Marrying a British-born expatriate in 1950, he worked for the Australian Atomic Energy Commission between 1957 and 1963, living in Sydney. He moved to Leeds, England in 1962, to work in Boston Spa until retirement, whereupon he became a European Information Officer for Leeds Metropolitan University. His daughter, diagnosed with Down syndrome, prompted him to work voluntarily with Mencap, and he continued to give lectures on his experiences at the Imperial War Museum. In 2004, he published his memoirs, The Odyssey of John Chillag, a Hungarian Jew Born in Vienna 2006: From Győr in Hungary to Australia and England Via Auschwitz and Buchenwald.
