= Chinese silver =

Metal alloy

Chinese silver is an alloy used for jewelry. Its composition is 38% copper, 17.5% zinc, 11.5% nickel, 11% cobalt, and 2% silver.
