= UNS C69100 =

Tungum, a bronze alloy of copper, aluminium, nickel, tin, and zinc

UNS C69100, also known as Tungum alloy, CW700R and CZ127, is a bronze copper alloy. It has a naturally occurring oxide layer, which on exposure to reagents develops into a very thin protective coating. Tungum resists both pitting and crevice corrosion in marine environments/atmospheres. This offers excellent service-life, even at intermittent duty in the corrosive "splash" zone.

Tungum is non-magnetic and has non-sparking properties. This allows Tungum to be used in high pressure gas pipework systems (oxygen and inert gases). Unusually for a copper alloy, it can be precipitation hardened using heat treatment techniques. This enables its physical properties to be modified as required, to suit various applications. It can be used for low temperature (cryogenic) applications.

In the decade after World War I, Sidney Tungay, a metallurgist, was experimenting with a new copper-based alloy which he hoped would look like gold when polished and which would be durable in everyday use. In an article in the 1934 British Trade Review, Tungum alloy was introduced thus:

"Tungum is an alloy discovered by a well known metallurgist from whose name the alloy is derived. Experimenting with a view to finding a combination of metals suitable for a special purpose he had in view, he produced a compound which is known as TUNGUM. Recognising that its close likeness to 22 carat gold would make it a marketable commodity the inventor carried out a series of tests which satisfied him that he had discovered a wonderful alloy."

The material is now mainly used in commercial diving and offshore applications, for the material's resistance to salt water corrosion.

Its composition is: 81-84% Cu, 0.70-1.20 Al, 0.8-1.40 Ni, 0.80-1.30 Si, with the remainder Zn
