= Rakusen's =

British kosher food manufacturer

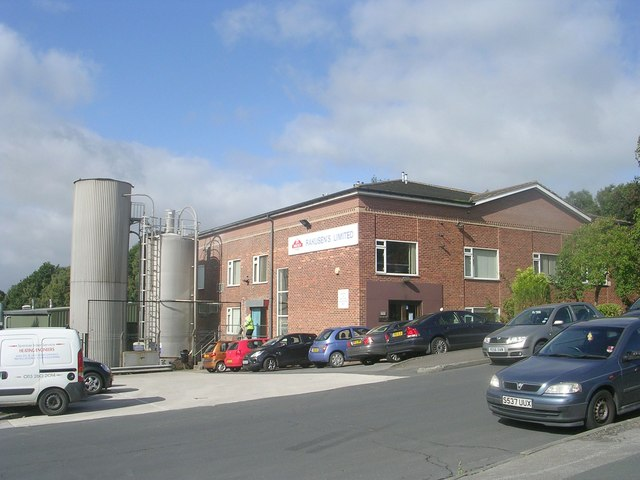
- Rakusen's factory in Leeds, 2011
- Industry: Kosher food manufacturer
- Founded: 1900; 126 years ago in Leeds, West Yorkshire, England
- Founder: Lloyd Rakusen
- Headquarters: Leeds, West Yorkshire, England
- Owner: Andrew Simpson
- Website: rakusens.co.uk

Rakusen's is a British kosher food manufacturer established in 1900 in Leeds, West Yorkshire, England, where it continues to operate today. Although best known for its matzo, matzo meal and matzo crackers, it also produces soups, beans, Tomor margarine, and other products.

Rakusen's was founded by a watch maker, Lloyd Rakusen, who started from baking matzos in his own back room and grew to form a factory in the city of Leeds, eventually passing the thriving company onto his family in 1944 on his death.

Rakusen's is owned by Andrew Simpson, who took over the company in 2015.

Rakusen's products are all certified kosher by the London Beth Din. Most British supermarkets stock some Rakusen's products all year, and special Passover matzo at Passover. Many of Rakusen's products are also popular with vegetarians and vegans.
