= Simon Morris (businessman) =

British businessman (born 1977)

- Born: 1977 (age 48–49)
- Occupation: Entrepreneur

Simon Morris (born 1977) is a British business entrepreneur specialising in property.

== Career ==
In 2008, SRM Holdings went into administration. This followed negative publicity from a BBC Panorama documentary, which led to fraud charges that were later dropped.

Two weeks after his businesses went bust, Morris was arrested as part of an investigation into money laundering and conspiracy to defraud based on allegations brought up by the administrations of the companies involved. Morris was convicted of blackmail and sentenced to 18 months in prison.

Simon Morris has since operated in an Investment Business in London and offers guides and advice on investment options in London.
