= Kopel Kahana =

British rabbinical scholar (1895–1978)

Kopel Kahana (1895 – 14 July 1978) was a British rabbinical scholar and authority on Jewish, Roman, and English law.

Born in Eisiskes, Lithuania in 1895, to Leah and Judah.

Kahana studied at the "Knesset Beit Yitzhak" Slobodka Yeshiva and served as rabbi in Bialowieza and Rozanai, Poland.

He was married to Sosza (Sarah) from the Szmojsz (pronounced Shmoish) family. Her father Michael was a well-known Rabbi in Kobrin. They had nine children together, but they all persihed in the Holocaust.

Just before the outbreak of World War II, he went to Cambridge University, where he studied Roman and English law, and became a professor thereof, specialising in comparative law. From 1946 to 1968 he was lecturer in Talmud and codes at Jews College, London, and had charge of the Rabbinical Diploma Class. On his retirement, he was designated Emeritus Professor.

Under the name of "K. Kagan", he contributed articles to some of the leading American and English law reviews.

Kahana died on 14 July 1978, and was brought to burial on the Mount of Olives in Jerusalem.

== Opinions ==
- In 1966, when the topic of the Halachic permissibility of consumption of Gelatin produced from non-kosher according to Jewish Law animals was subject to much debate, Kahana wrote a responsum in Hebrew on the topic titled 'תשובה בעניין גלטין' - 'A Responsum on the Matter of Gelatin' in which he permitted the usage of such gelatin in consumer products. This responsum was printed as a booklet by Narod Press in Whitechapel in 1966.
- Kahana believed that the State of Israel should be governed by Jewish Civil law, and in 1960 published a book in English on the topic titled 'The Case for Jewish Civil Law in the Jewish State'.
- He taught in the English language, opposing the deep-rooted tradition that Talmud could only be taught in Yiddish (even though Yiddish was his own mother tongue), claiming that English was richer in technical terms and more suitable for explaining Talmudic studies, quite apart from the fact that young people of the current generation were unable to study Talmud because they did not understand Yiddish.

== Writings ==
Among his published writings are:

- Three Great Systems of Jurisprudence (1955), a comparative study of Jewish, Roman, and English Law
- The Case for Jewish Civil Law in the Jewish State (1960), which argues that Jewish law contained enough potential to be able to govern Israel with efficiency and justice
- The Theory of Marriage in Jewish Law (1966), which expounds the Jewish concept of marriage and correct misconceptions concerning it
- Birkat Kohen (1972) in Hebrew, comments on the laws governing Jewish marital laws, an expanded and more Talmudical version of the English 'The Theory of Marriage in Jewish Law (1966)'
- Nachalat Kohen (1977), in Hebrew, a study and discussion of the concept of inheritance according to Jewish law
