= Coinage metals =

Metals suitable for making coins

The coinage metals comprise those metallic chemical elements and alloys which have been used to mint coins. Historically, most coinage metals are from the three nonradioactive members of group 11 of the periodic table: copper, silver and gold. Copper is usually augmented with tin or other metals to form bronze. Gold, silver and bronze or copper were the principal coinage metals of the ancient world, the medieval period and into the late modern period when the diversity of coinage metals increased. Coins are often made from more than one metal, either using alloys, coatings (cladding/plating) or bimetallic configurations. While coins are primarily made from metal, some non-metallic materials have also been used.

== History ==
Early coinage made from metal came into use during the Axial Age in the Greek world, in northern India, and in China, as coins became a widespread embodiment of money. Bronze, gold, silver and electrum (a naturally occurring pale yellow mixture of gold and silver that was further alloyed with silver and copper) were used. Silver coins from about 700 BC are known from Aegina Island. Early electrum coins from Ephesus, Lydia, date from about 650 BC.

The gold Croeseids, issued in Lydia, were the first true gold coins with a standardized purity for general circulation. The gold and silver Croeseids formed the world's first bimetallic monetary system, c. 550 BC. The Persian daric was also an early gold coin which, along with a similar silver coin, the siglos, (from Ancient Greek σίγλος, Hebrew שֶׁקֶל (shékel)) represented the bimetallic monetary standard of the Achaemenid Persian Empire. These coins were also very well known in the Persian and Sassanids era, most notably, in Susa and in Ctesiphon. Precious metals were used historically in commodity money and are found in bullion coins and some collectable coins.

Coins functioning as fiat money were made from a larger variety of base metals. Alloys including readily available metals such as copper, tin, and lead were commonly used in lower value coins. Bronze, a copper-tin alloy, was particularly widespread. In some contexts however, other alloys such as potin (copper-tin-lead) were used. Debased silver alloys like billon also became commonly used, especially in Late Antiquity.

== Multiple metals ==
Coins may be composed of multiple metals using alloys, coatings, or bimetallic forms. Coin alloys include bronze, electrum and cupronickel. Plating, cladding or other coating methods are used to form an outer layer of metal and are typically used to replace a more expensive metal while retaining the former appearance. For example, United States cents since 1982 are zinc with copper-plating, and thus retain their prior copper look while having a less expensive composition. Coatings may also be used as a form of debasement in commodity money. Bimetallic coins are used for their distinctive appearance and generally have an outer ring of one metal or alloy surrounding a center of contrasting metal.

== Requirements for a coinage metal ==
Coins that are intended for circulation may circulate for decades and thus must have excellent resistance to wear and corrosion. Achieving this goal typically necessitates the use of base metal alloys. In addition, some metals, such as manganese, are unsuitable as they are too hard to take an impression well or are apt to wear out stamping machines at the mint.

When minting coins, especially low denomination coins, there is a risk that the value of metal within a coin is greater than the face value, leading to negative seigniorage. This leads to the possibility of smelters taking coins and melting them down for the scrap value of the metal. Pre-1992 British pennies were made of 97% copper; but as of 2008, based on the price of copper, the value of a penny from this period is 1.5 new-pence. Modern British pennies are now made of copper-plated steel.

Cupronickel, a base metal alloy with varying proportions of copper and nickel, was introduced as a cheaper alternative for silver in coinage. Cupronickel, most commonly 75% copper, 25% nickel, has a silver color, is hard wearing and has excellent striking properties, essential for the design of the coin to be pressed accurately and quickly during manufacture. However, in the 21st century with the prices of both copper and nickel rising, it has become common to experiment with various alloys of steel, often stainless steel as an even cheaper alternative. For example, in India some coins have been made from a stainless steel that contains 82% iron, 18% chromium, and many other countries that have minted coins that contain metals now worth nearly the coin face-value, are experimenting with various steel alloys. Italy had earlier experimented with acmonital, a stainless steel alloy, for its coins.

A number of more exotic metals have been used to make demonstration or fantasy coins which have not been used to make monetized coins for a nation-state. Some of these elements would make excellent coins in theory (e.g. zirconium). More expensive metals that are intrinsically valuable as commodities are less practical as coinage due to their cost, but could be used for bullion coins.

== Chemical elements used in circulating coins ==
Element	Example usage
Aluminium	First issued 1907 for circulation by East Africa & Uganda Protectorates, though earlier patterns exist
Antimony	Used in Guizhou, China 10 cents coin of 1931. Used in medallion medal alloys
Carbon	In all steel and iron coins. A few "pressed galvanic coal" Notgeld coins were minted during hyperinflation in post WWI Germany
Chromium	Used for plating coins and in some rare hard stainless steel coins
Copper	Many coins throughout history were made of gold, silver and copper.
Silver	Many coins throughout history were made of gold, silver and copper.
Gold	Many coins throughout history were made of gold, silver and copper.
Iron	Numerous Chinese cash coins were made of iron, with the first being issued by the Han dynasty in 118 BCE. From 1942 through 1952, some of the Swedish krona coins – such as the 1, 2 and 5 öre – were made of iron.
Lead	Most commonly seen in southeast Asian coinage. Certain 19th-century Japanese coins are also made of lead, such as those issued by Yonezawa in the 1860s.
Manganese	American wartime "silver nickels" were composed of 56% copper, 35% silver, and 9% manganese. The reason given for this composition is that it matched the magnetic and electrical properties of 75% copper/25% nickel nickels, which was important for vending machines. Modern American dollars contain a small amount of manganese.
Magnesium	Magnesium-aluminum coins were issued in 1943 for the Lodz Ghetto mark in Poland. Magnesium is a minor additive in many aluminum coins; this alloy is called magnalium.
Nickel	Used unknowingly in alloys since antiquity. The first pure nickel coin was the Swiss 20 Rappen of 1881. A book published by the International Nickel Company of Canada in 1933 lists dozens of coins minted out of nickel.
Phosphorus	Used in stainless steel alloy Acmonital for the Italian lira coins.
Silicon	Used in stainless steel alloy Acmonital for the Italian lira coins.
Sulfur	Used in stainless steel alloy Acmonital for the Italian lira coins.
Platinum	The Russian 3, 6, and 12 ruble coins of Nicholas I, issued 1828–1845, were the world's only circulating platinum coins. Numerous bullion coins have been issued.
Tin	Portuguese Malacca 1521–1557 bastardo; Malaysia tin hat money; Great Britain farthing and halfpenny 1684–1692; Thailand satangs from the 1940s.
Zinc	Twelfth century Indian coins were made of zinc. Vietnamese cash coins of the 1800s were made of zinc, as was the Vietnamese Tonkin 1/600 piastre of 1905. Zinc was a common metal of choice for American "good-for" tokens.

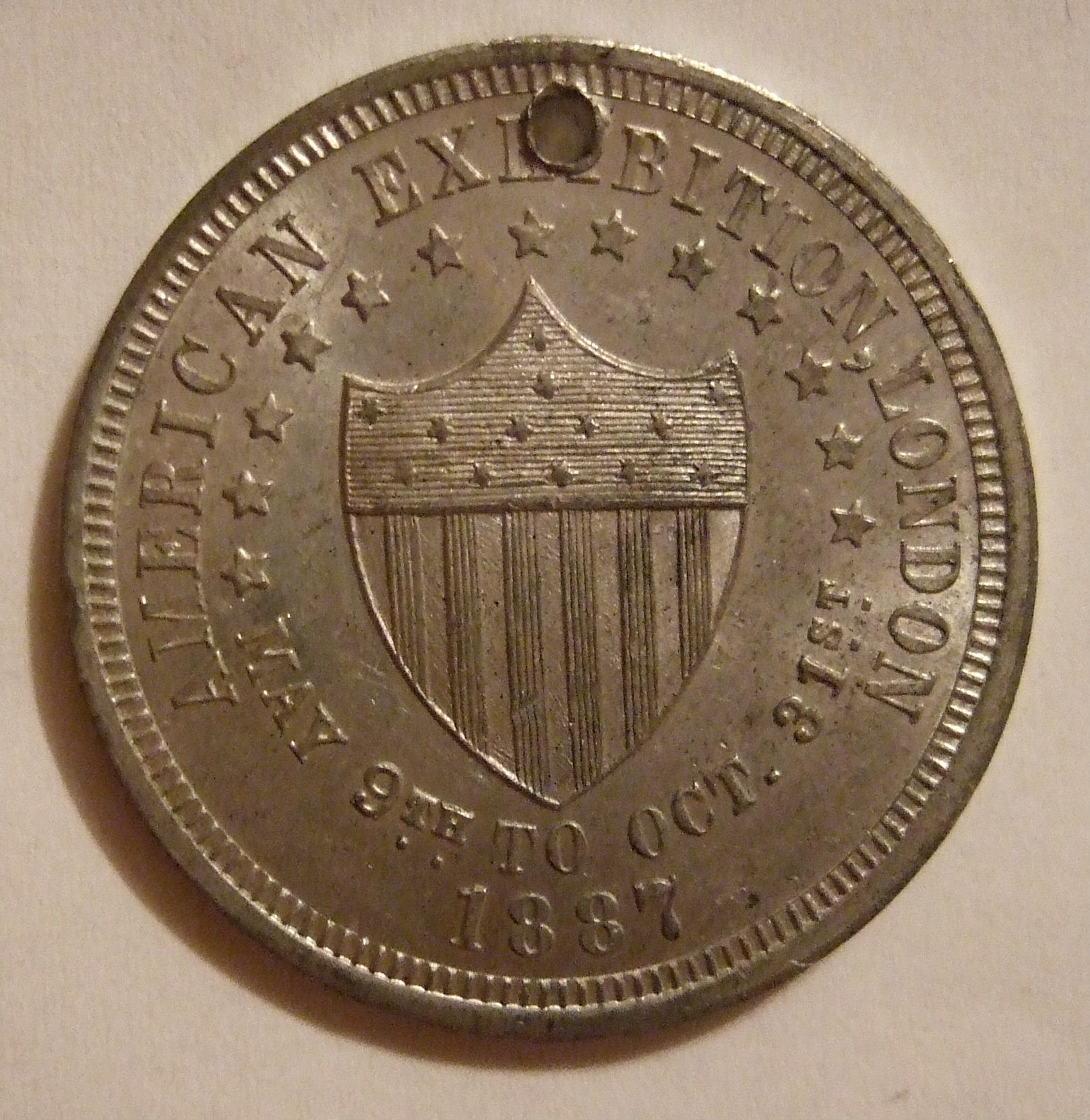
An aluminium token coin from the 1887 American Exhibition in London. At the time, aluminium was complex to produce and more valuable than silver

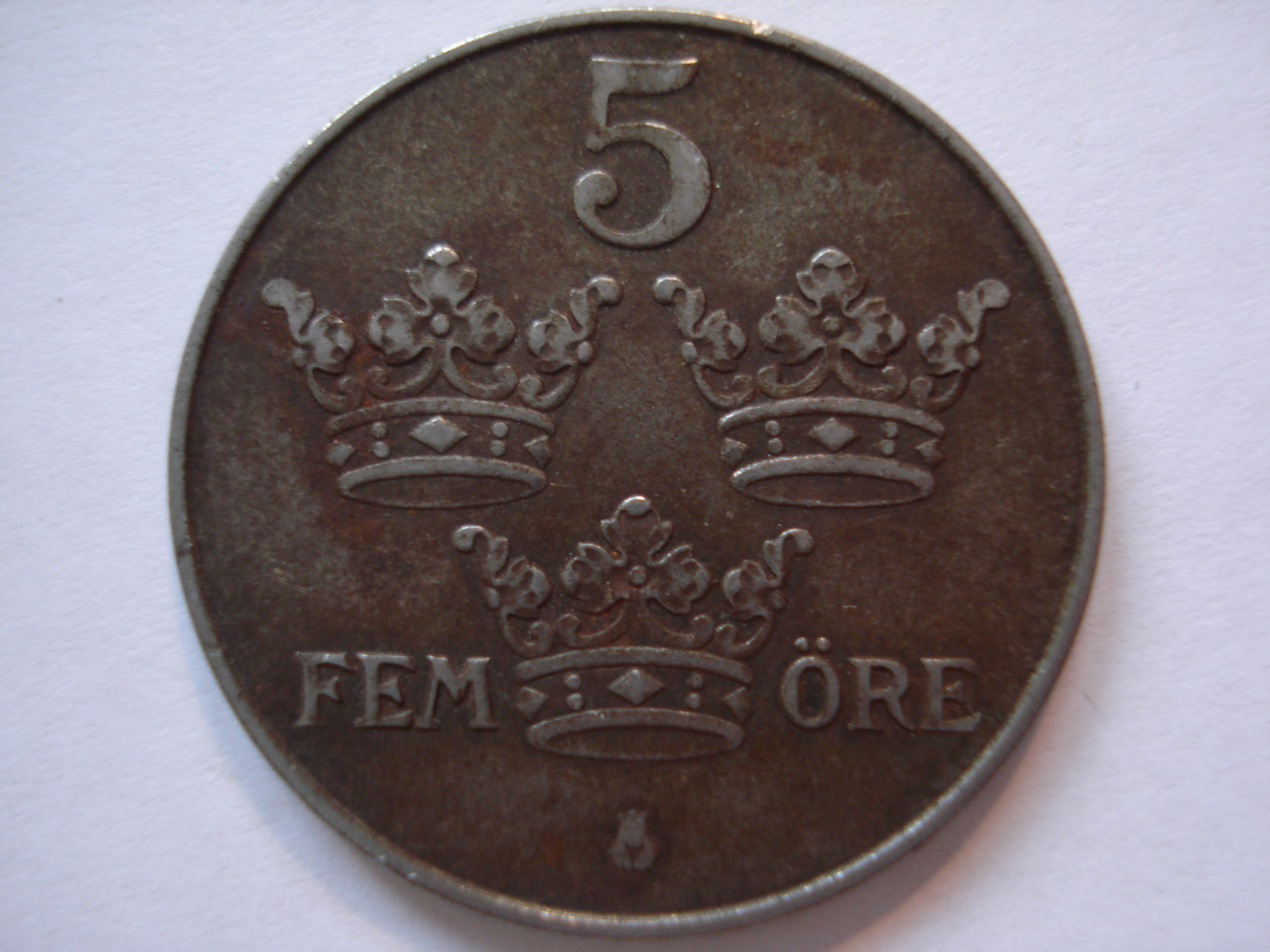
A 1950 iron Swedish krona coin, with face value of 5 öre

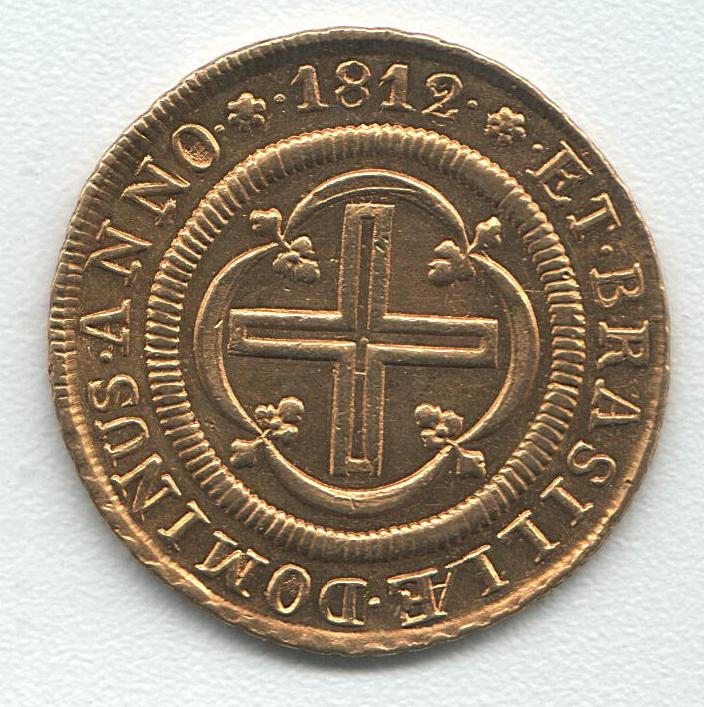
An 1812 gold 4000 réis coin from colonial Brazil

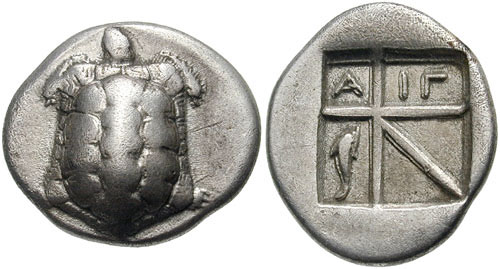
Silver drachma from the island of Aegina, after 404 BC

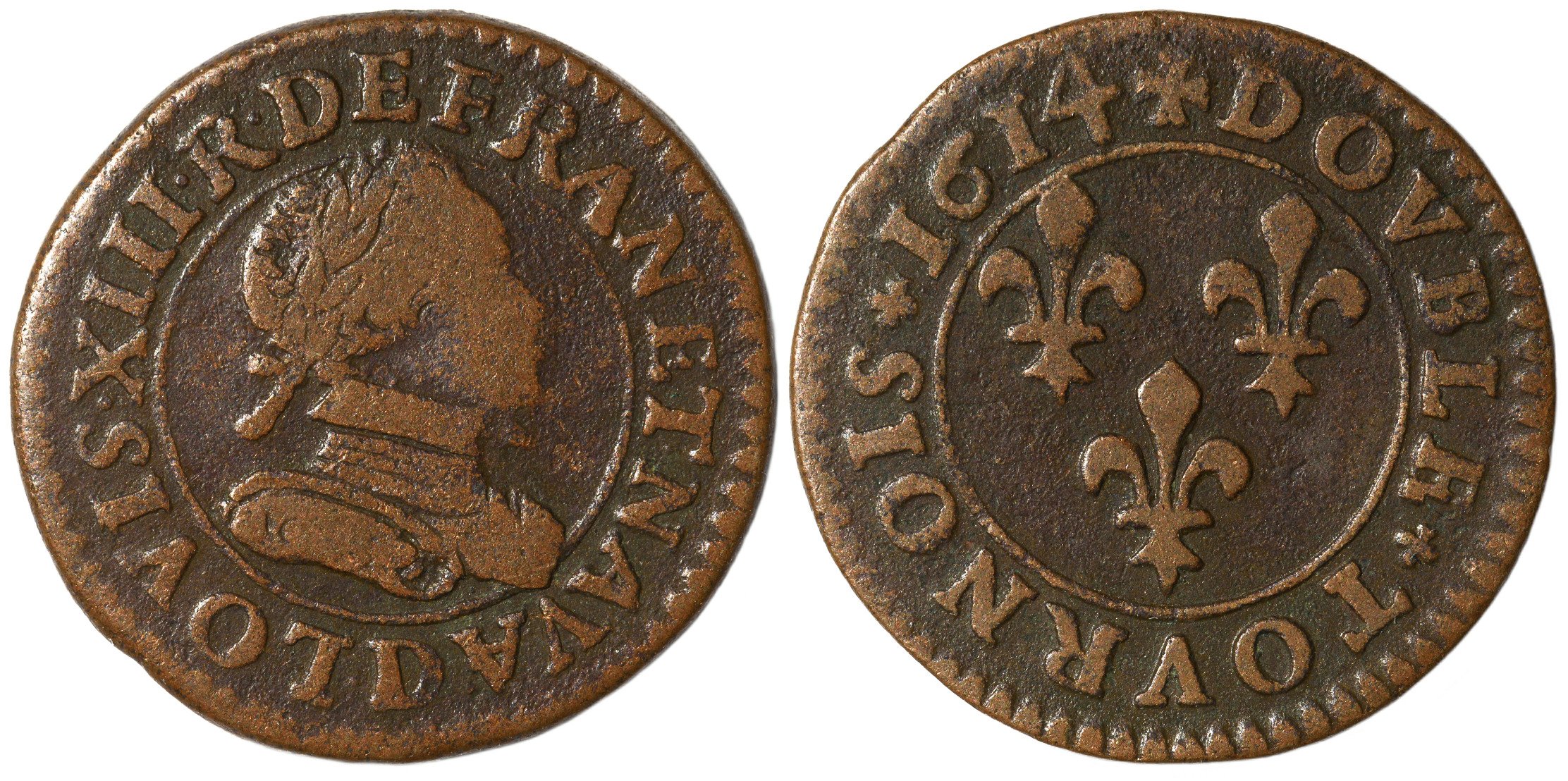
A 1614 copper double tournois from France

In 1992, twenty-four chemical elements used in world coinage were documented by Jay and Marieli Roe in an award-winning exhibit and publication: aluminum, antimony, carbon, cobalt, copper, gold, hafnium, iron, lead, magnesium, molybdenum, nickel, niobium, palladium, platinum, rhenium, silver, tantalum, tin, titanium, tungsten, vanadium, zinc and zirconium. Chromium and manganese, however, were not mentioned, even though both elements had been used in common circulation coins (Canada wartime V nickels and US wartime Jefferson nickels, respectively) long before the article's publication.

== Non-circulating ==
Chemical elements used in non-circulating commemorative, demo, bullion or fantasy coins, medals, patterns, and trial strikes:

- Cadmium: 1828 medal made by G. Loos for the marriage of Heinrich von Dechen, "of Silesian cadmium".
- Cobalt: 2005 Cameroon 750 CFA francs struck in cobalt-plated iron.
- Hafnium: Fred Zinkann demo coin.
- Iridium: 2013 1/25 oz 10 franc bullion coin issued by Rwanda as part of "Noble Five" precious metals set.
- Molybdenum: Demo coin, Fred Zinkann. 2008 1 tr oz coins by Coins By Design, Murray Buckner (mintage 250).
- Niobium: Austria has issued a number of bimetallic 25 euro coins with a niobium center.
- Palladium: First issued 1966 by Sierra Leone. Also presentation sets from Tonga and bullion coins of various countries.
- Rhenium: Fred Zinkann fantasy pieces, Pope Matthew Triple Ducat and Malvinas 5 Australes
- Rhodium: 2014 1/25 oz 10 franc bullion coin issued by Rwanda as part of "Noble Six" precious metals set. Also Cohen Mint bullion round.
- Ruthenium: 1967 1/2 Hau from Tonga was 98% palladium and 2% ruthenium.
- Selenium: 1862 medal in UK Science Museum, commemorating Berzelius, discoverer of the element.
- Silicon: Privately struck US quarter patterns dated 1964 (Pollock-5380) in nickel-silicon alloy.
- Tantalum: Used in a bimetallic silver-tantalum coin from Kazakhstan.
- Tellurium: 1896 Hungarian mining medal. Reproductions exist from 1975.
- Titanium: First issued 1999 by Gibraltar. Austria has made bimetallic silver/titanium commemoratives.
- Tungsten: While Tungsten alloys are too hard for practical use, a few private demos have been struck for experimentation, e.g. Fred Zinkann US half eagle patterns.
- Uranium: Two types of a German medal of native uranium.
- Vanadium: 2011 1 Troy ounce coins by Coins By Design, Murray Buckner (mintage 20).
- Zirconium: 2012 1 Troy ounce coins, including 50 black & 50 Rainbow, by Coins By Design, Murray Buckner (mintage 500).

=== Element Series ===
Beginning in 2006, Dave Hamric (Metallium) has been attempting to strike "coins" (technically tokens or medals, about the size of a US cent) of every stable chemical element. He has struck tokens of the following elements: aluminium, antimony, barium (reactive, sealed in glass capsule), beryllium, bismuth, boron (mixed with binder, sealed in resin cast), cadmium, calcium (reactive, sealed in glass capsule), carbon (mixed with binder, sealed in resin cast), cerium (reactive, sealed in glass capsule), chromium, cobalt, copper, dysprosium, erbium, europium (reactive, sealed in glass capsule), gadolinium, gallium, gold, hafnium, holmium, indium, iridium, iron, lanthanum (reactive, sealed in glass capsule), lead, lutetium, magnesium, mercury (sealed in resin cast, containing the expected coin-weight of liquid mercury), molybdenum, neodymium (reactive, sealed in glass capsule), nickel, niobium, palladium, phosphorus (mixed with binder, sealed in resin cast), platinum, praseodymium (reactive, sealed in glass capsule), rhenium, rhodium, ruthenium, samarium (reactive, sealed in glass capsule), scandium, selenium, silver, strontium (reactive, sealed in glass capsule), sulfur, tantalum, tellurium, terbium, thallium (extremely poisonous; lead token clad on one side with thallium foil and sealed in resin), thulium, tin, titanium, uranium (not offered for sale), vanadium, ytterbium, yttrium, zinc, zirconium.

== Non-metallic materials used for circulating coins ==
Material	Example of usage
Cardboard	Cardboard, 15 kopecks (1915, Russian Empire)
Charcoal or similar	1000 mark private notgeld, Conradty Company, 1922)
Fiber	1 and 5 fen coins, Manchukuo, 1944–45.
Glass	The Poland 10 zloty coin of 2008 has a glass center, as does a Congo 1000 francs coin issued in 2015.
Leather	Leather rubles of the Russian-American Company in Alaska. American depression scrip in the 1930s.
Paper	Paper 50 kopecks (1923, Soviet Russia). Leiden issued coins made out of the pages of prayer books in 1574 as an emergency issue, making them the first issuers outside of China to issue paper money.
Plastic	Transnistrian ruble coins
Porcelain/Ceramics	Porcelain 50 Pfennig Notgeld (1927, Bavaria) produced at the Meissen Porcelain Works
Silk	Silk money from Khorezm, in Uzbekistan and other central Asian countries around the 1930s. Bielefeld notgeld in the 1920s.
Stone	Rai stones from Yap island
Wood	Used in Japan in the 1860s, for Austrian and German notgelds in the 1920s, and Tenino in the 1930s. A Congo 5 francs coin issued in 2006 was perhaps the first 'official' wooden coin. Used also in wooden nickels.

== See also ==
- Billon
- Fineness
- Gilding metal
- Italma
- Melchior
- Nickel silver
- Nordic Gold
- Oroide
