= Fritz Quant =

German painter (1888–1933)

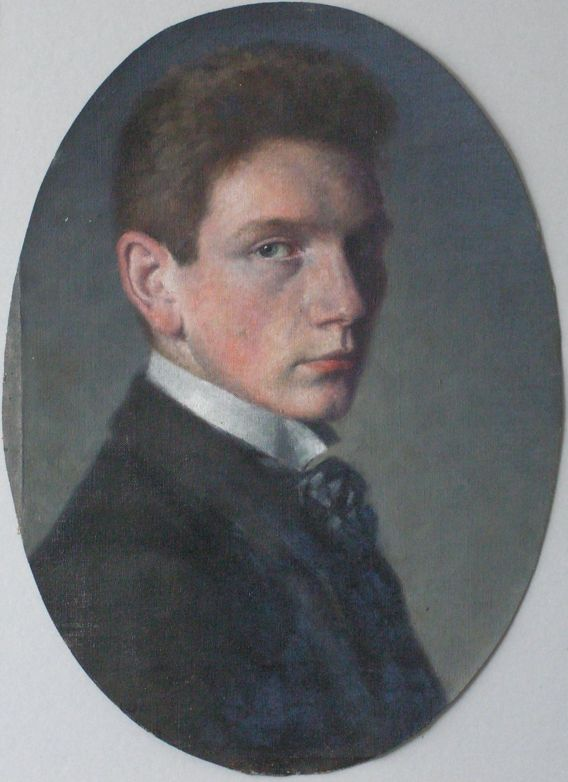
Self-portrait (1908)

Franz Xaver Friedrich Quant, known as Fritz (18 February 1888 in Trier – 3 November 1933 in Trier) was a German painter, graphic artist and designer.

== Biography ==
His father was a master cooper and innkeeper. He began his studies with an apprenticeship to the church painter, Peter Thomas (1854–1935). In 1908, he passed the journeyman's examination and found employment as a "painter's assistant" to August Trümper at the Trier Arts and Crafts School. Four years later, he enlisted in the Army, but served only a short time before being discharged due to a chronic illness.

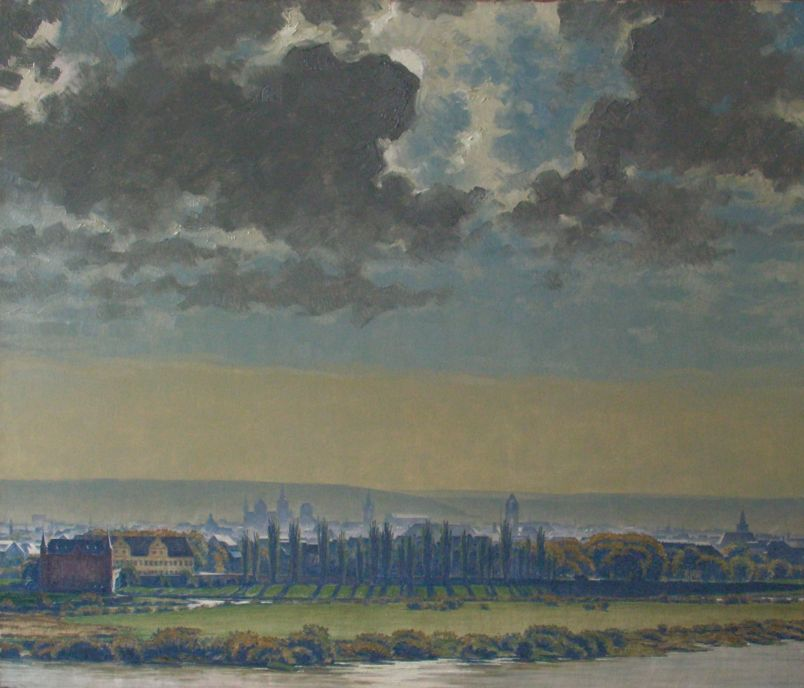
View of Trier from the West

He then continued his education at the Hochschule für Grafik und Buchkunst in Leipzig, where he studied etching with Alois Kolb. He was there from 1915 to 1918, when he returned to Trier and took over the painting class from Trümper, who had been drafted into the Landsturm. By special permission of Richard Riemerschmid, Director of the Arts and Crafts School in Munich, he was able to spend the years 1920–1922 studying with Robert Engels and Adolf Schinnerer. It was then he developed a style that combined Post-Impressionism with Expressionism.

In 1925, he got married and settled in Trier, where he worked as a free-lance artist until 1930, when he returned to the Arts and Crafts School as a teacher. During those years he was, however, well-connected; belonging to numerous local and regional professional associations and art societies. His "View of Trier from the West" was presented as a gift to Chancellor Gustav Stresemann.

In addition to his paintings, he illustrated travel brochures, provided drawings to newspapers, created advertisements (mostly for wine and tobacco) and produced designs for the local Notgeld during the period of hyperinflation. In his last years, as his health declined, he devoted himself mostly to interior design; notably the Town Hall in Wittlich.

Shortly after the Nazi takeover (just before his death) he was admitted to the Trier branch of the "Reich Cartel of Fine Arts" and given a license to exhibit. In 1959, his widow wrote a will leaving his works to the City of Trier. After her death in 1976, over 400 works were transferred to the Stadtmuseum Simeonstift. A street in Trier has been named after him.

== Selected works ==
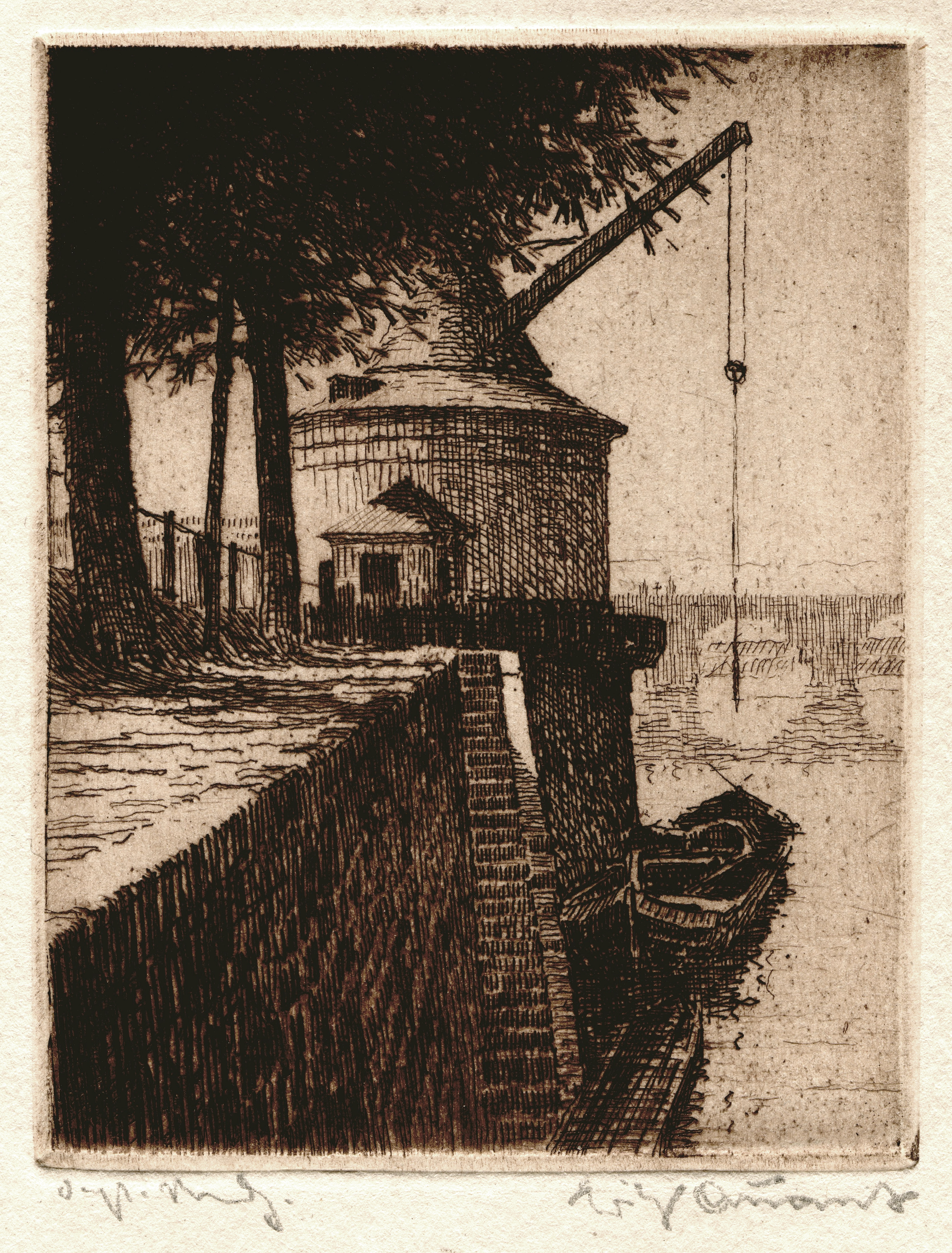
Crane on the Moselle (etching)

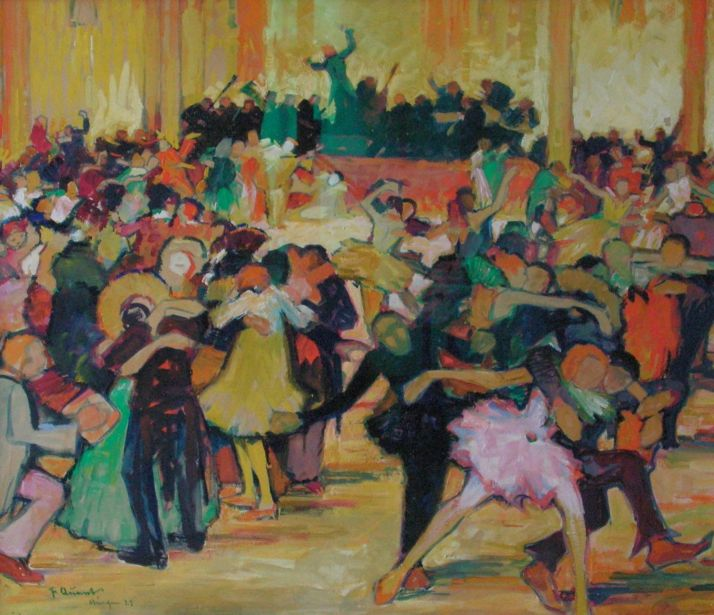
Fasching in Munich

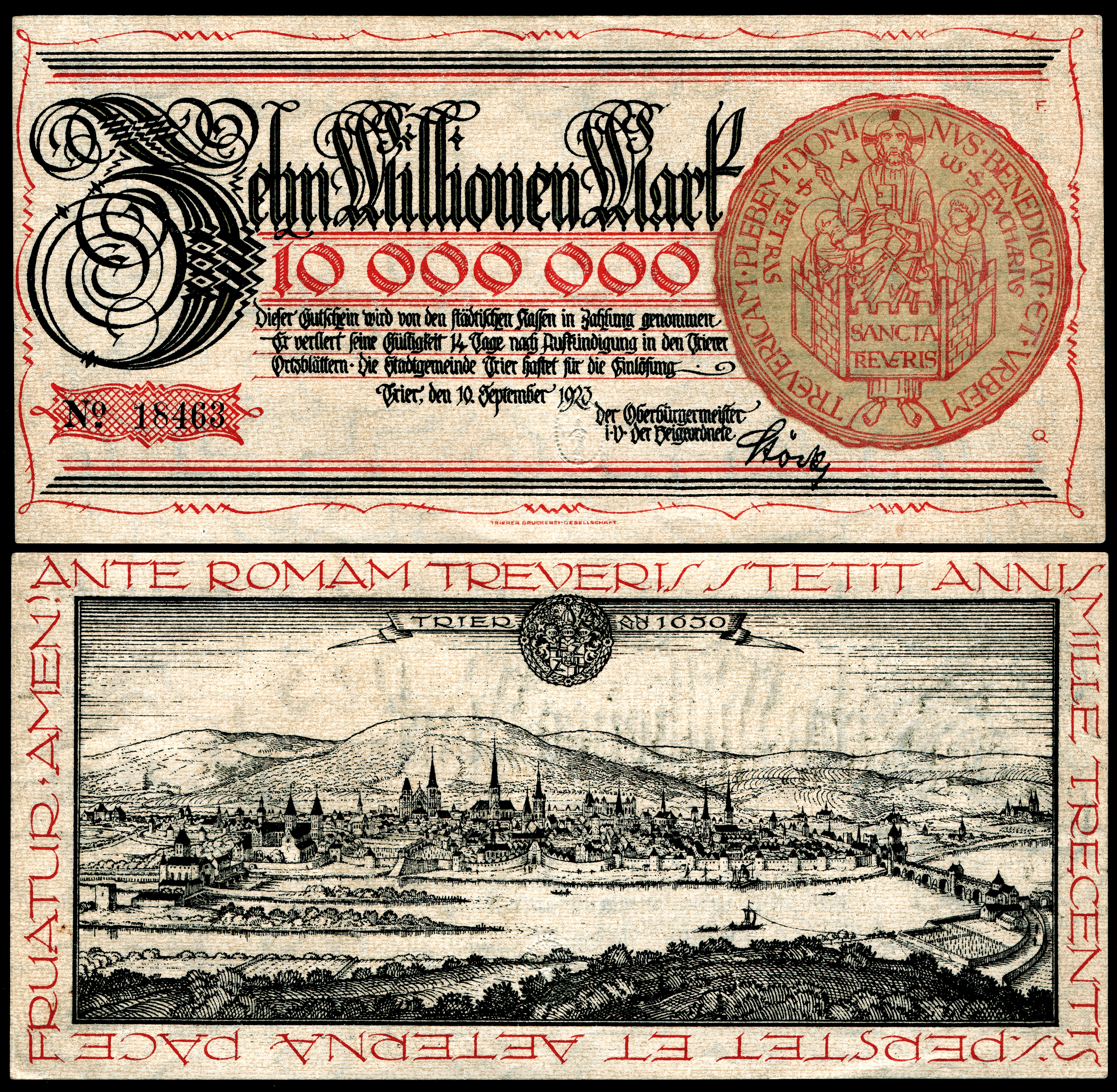
Ten Million Mark Notgeld

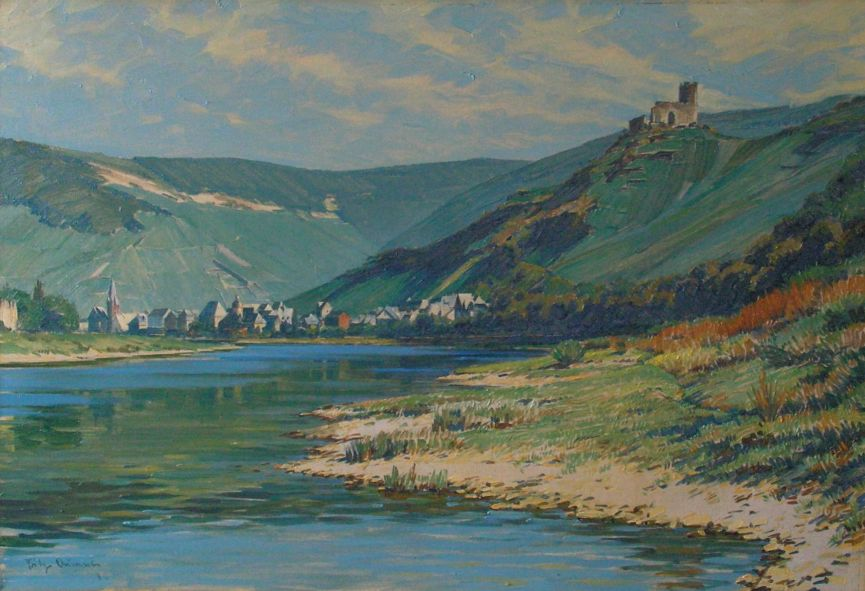
Bernkastel

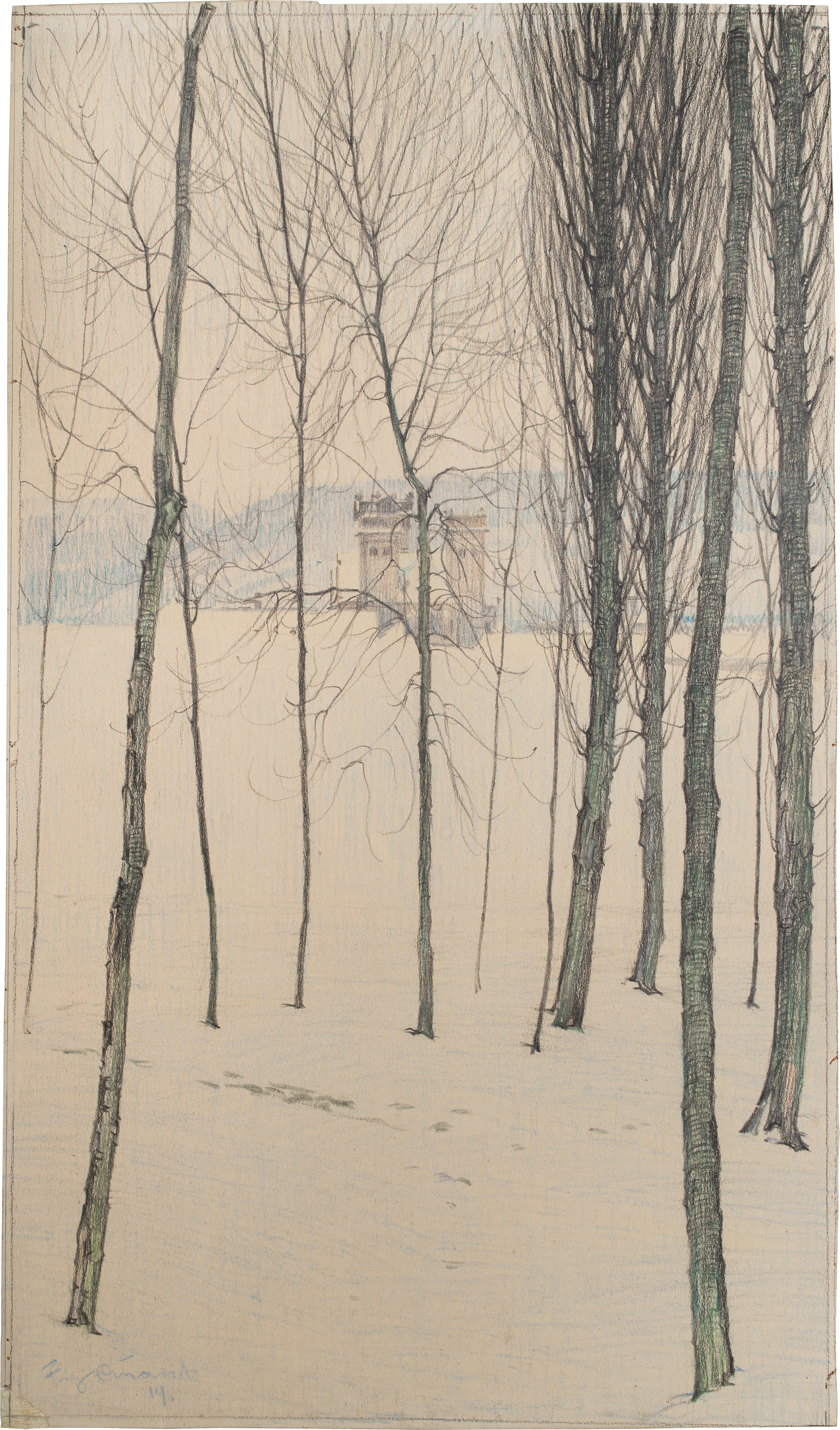
St. Matthias' Abbey (crayon and pencil drawing)

== Sources ==
- Elisabeth Dühr (ed.), Christine Beier and Heinrich Nebgen: Fritz Quant (1888–1933) – Ein Trierer Maler und Grafiker (exhibition catalog), Stadtmuseum Simeonstift, 1994, ISBN 3-930866-01-3.
- Matthias Mehs: "Fritz Quant als Maler seiner Heimat". In: Trierische Heimat, Vol.10 (1933/34), pp.73–75.
- Reinhard Heß: "Fritz Quant, der Maler". In: Neues Trierisches Jahrbuch 1967, pp. 53–56.
- Dieter Ahrens: "Das Werk Fritz Quants im Städtischen Museum Simeonstift". In: Neues Trierisches Jahrbuch 1981, pp. 53–54.
