= Nordic gold =

Copper alloy mainly used in coinage

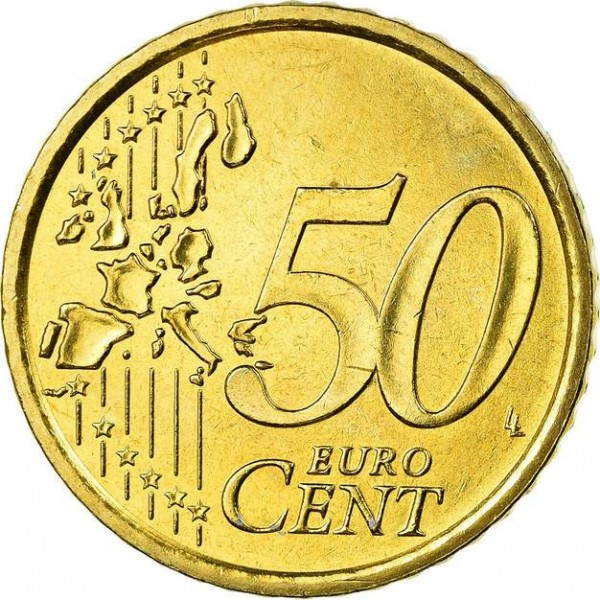
50 euro cent coin made out of Nordic gold.

Nordic gold (Swedish: nordiskt guld) is a golden-coloured copper alloy which is used primarily to mint coins. It contains no gold despite the name, and is a type of aluminium bronze made with copper, aluminium, zinc, and tin. It was originally developed in Finland for Swedish coinage to be golden-coloured, tarnish-resistant, malleable, durable over time, and hypoallergenic. It was later and more notably used in some Euro coins, as well as other countries, and has been researched for other purposes.

== History ==
Italy pioneered the use of an aluminium bronze alloy for its coinage, called bronzital, for its 5 and 10 centesimi in 1939, before the alloy was finalized as 92% copper, 6% aluminium, and 2% nickel in 1967. Since then, it has been used in the 20, 200, and 500 Italian lira coins until 2001. Aluminium bronze has also been used for the Australian and New Zealand 1 and 2 dollar coins, the pre-2009 Mexican 20 and 50 centavo coins, the inner cores of the bi-metallic Mexican 1, 2, and 5 peso coins, the pre-2017 Philippine 10-peso coin, the Canadian 2 dollar coin (the "toonie"), and the outer rings of the Mexican 10, 20, 50, and 100 peso coins.

=== Development ===
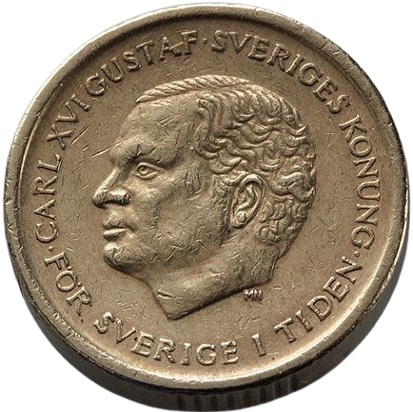
The Swedish 10 crown coin, first made with Nordic gold in 1991.

The Swedish Mint sought a new gold-coloured alloy for the 10 Crown coin in 1991, and specified several desired attributes: they wanted it to be tarnish-resistant, malleable, durable over time, and hypoallergenic. The alloy also had to allow complex designs to be stamped.

Nordic gold was developed by Mariann Sundberg in 1991 while she worked for the Finnish metal company Outokumpu.

The Swedish Mint's desire for a golden color could only realistically be fulfilled by an alloy of copper, since every other coinage metal except gold is grey. Outokumpu tested the alloy for reactions to sweat, leather, and various fabrics. They tried numerous compositions, but found the best to be made of copper with aluminium, zinc, and tin. Meanwhile, some metals traditionally used in coins can cause allergic reactions, which limited their options. The use of copper also was noted for the ability to prevent the spread of bacteria.

The European Commission required Outokumpu to provide the manufacturing rights to the alloy without royalty payments in order to prevent a monopoly, however the company does retain intellectual property rights to it. American Metal Market predicted in 2001 that its use in Euro coinage would impact the nickel market, estimating 50,000 to 70,000 tonnes of nickel would be scrapped from obsolete coinage in 2002.

== Properties ==
Nordic gold's composition is 89% copper, 5% aluminium, 5% zinc, and 1% tin. The colour and density are unlike pure gold, and compared to commercial copper metal, the alloy has significantly smaller grains. A thin oxide material is formed after abrasive polishing. It is hypoallergenic, antimycotic and somewhat antimicrobial, especially after abrasion.

Coins made with the alloy have a specific electromagnetic "signature" aided by the electrical conductivity of copper, which helps with their authentication by coin acceptors. This makes counterfeiting the coins more difficult, as well as the high cost of production, and difficulty of melting the alloy.

A study published in the March 2004 issue of the British Journal of Dermatology found that the Euro 50 cent piece made with the alloy causes only a weak reaction in 16% of the 25 study participants who had a nickel allergy. This contrasted with 28% of the participants who had a reaction to the nickel-containing one and two Euro coins, as well as an additional 48% who had even stronger reactions. The copper-plated steel one and two Euro cent pieces caused a weak reaction in one participant (4%), and the former Italian 100 lire, which are made of nickel-less acmonital steel, caused no reaction in any. The authors ascribed the reaction from non-nickel containing coins to exposure with nickel-containing coins and cited the EU's Nickel Directive as an important policy. They recommended Nordic gold as a good material for minting coins.

== Uses in coinage ==
=== Circulating ===
Nordic gold was originally developed for the Swedish 10-crown coins in 1991 and the 5-crown coin as of 2016. The alloy was considered by the United States Mint in 1998 for the United States Sacagawea dollar. Many other currencies have also made use of the alloy, most notably in the 50-, 20-, and 10-cent coins of the euro.

=== Commemorative ===
In 2005 Sweden issued a 50-crown commemorative coin made with Nordic gold to celebrate the 150th anniversary of the first postage stamp in Sweden, designed by Annie Winblad Jakubowski. Poland used the alloy in its "Great Battles" commemorative coin series of 2 Polish złoty issues from 2010 to 2014.

== Other uses ==
It has been studied for antimicrobial applications in hospital, to help prevent MRSA infections.

== See also ==
- Base metal
- Coinage metal
- Cupronickel
- Oroide
