= 1 Billion Mark coin of the Province of Westphalia =

The 1 Billion Mark coin of the Province of Westphalia from 1923 is a state emergency money coin of the State Bank of the Prussian Province of Westphalia from the period of German hyperinflation in 1923. The face value of one trillion marks is the highest ever held by a German coin.

== Description ==
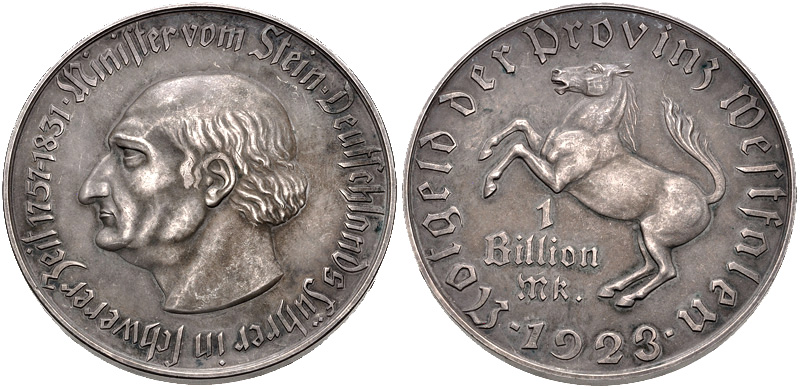
Emergency money of the Province of Westphalia, 1 Trillion Mark from 1923, nickel silver, silver-plated (Diameter 60 mm, Jaeger No. 28)

The 1 Billion Mark coin is the last issue of state emergency coins of the Province of Westphalia, which were minted in 1921, 1922, and 1923 in aluminum, tombac, bronze, copper, and nickel silver in the denominations of 50 pfennig (1921) to 1 Trillion Marks (1923), showing on the reverse side the leaping Westphalian Horse, and on the obverse side mostly the head portrait of Baron vom Stein or on a few issues the bust of Annette von Droste-Hülshoff.

On the obverse side of the largest state German emergency money coin, the 1 Billion Mark coin, is the head portrait of Karl Freiherr vom und zum Stein, the initiator of the Prussian reforms. The reverse side shows the leaping Westphalian Horse. Below are the mint year 1923 and the denomination "1/Billion/Mk." The inscription reads: "Minister vom Stein ∙ Germany's Leader in Difficult Times 1757–1831 ∙ // emergency money of the Province of Westphalia". The 1 Billion Mark coin from the time of the Weimar Republic was minted in nickel silver, a copper-nickel-zinc alloy, silver-plated, in a mintage of 11,113 pieces without mint mark with a smooth edge. 500 pieces were issued gold-plated. The unusually large diameter is 60 millimeters, the weight approximately 83 grams. The very rare pieces in bronze are proof strikes.

== Design ==
The design was created by the medalist and sculptor Rudolf Bosselt, the director of the School of Applied Arts Magdeburg. Evidence for this can be found on the so-called hybrid medal, which also belongs to the emergency coinages of the Province of Westphalia and, in contrast to the 1 Billion Mark coin (and the other emergency coins), is signed. It has two obverse sides. On one side is the head portrait of Freiherr vom Stein and on the other the bust of poetess Droste-Hülshoff. The two sides are identical to the obverse sides of the emergency coins with the denomination. The medal is signed with R. Bosselt on the side with the head portrait of vom Stein and with A. Rüller on the other side with the bust of Droste-Hülshoff. The artist signatures on the hybrid medal are proof of the design of the obverse sides of the emergency coins, including the unsigned 1 Billion Mark coin.

== Historical context ==
The financial consequences of the war were the reparations imposed by the victors of World War I and the devaluation of money caused by financing the war through war bonds. The post-war economic burdens led to overloading the budget, which led to accelerated inflation to avoid state bankruptcy.

On January 11, 1923, the occupation of the Ruhr area by French and Belgian troops began. This was also the beginning of the Ruhr resistance, the passive resistance proclaimed by Chancellor Wilhelm Cuno. A contribution to support the resistance was realized through the net proceeds from the 1923 minted state emergency coins of the Province of Westphalia. The government under Gustav Stresemann had to end the Ruhr resistance and stabilize the currency.

On October 16, 1923, the decision to establish the German Rentenbank to eliminate inflation was announced. In the same year, on November 15, a new currency system was introduced. This ended the inflation. The Rentenbank was founded with 2.3 billion Rentenmark. The coverage was based on debts of agriculture and industry to the Reich. The exchange rate was:

- 1 Rentenmark = 1 Trillion Papiermark

The Dawes Plan to settle the reparations issue on April 9, 1924, established the financial basis for reparations. On October 11, 1924, the Rentenmark was supplemented by the Reichsmark.

The issuance of the 1 Billion Mark coin of the Province of Westphalia did not go as planned. When the coin was to be issued in 1923, it had already been devalued by hyperinflation. The minted pieces were only issued in early 1924 after the end of inflation and stabilization of the mark. The now invalid coin was sold to collectors and interested parties as a reminder of the difficult time of inflation.

== Replica ==
There are official replicas of this now rare 1 Billion Mark coin made of nickel silver and silver by the Hamburg Mint, which are gold-plated and marked with a small punch mark with the year of manufacture, e.g., 2001 or 2015, on the neck of the head portrait. This allows the replica, identical in coin image to the original, to be distinguished from the much more expensive original. However, there are also unmarked replicas (counterfeits) that can be recognized by their lower quality.

== Note ==
Only the denominations of 1921 of 50 pfennig to 10 marks were used as emergency money. They lost their validity on February 1, 1922. The other emergency coins, including the 1 Billion Mark coin, have "medal character". They were never real means of payment. The net proceeds from the coinage were to be used for social purposes. The gold-plated 1 Billion Mark coin and other gold-plated emergency coins of the province were also referred to as "Ruhr ducats".

== Literature ==
- Peter Menzel: German Emergency Coins and Other Money Substitutes 1873–1932, Berlin 1982.
- Siegfried Bauer: German Coins 1871 to 1932 including the Coins of the Former Colonies and State Emergency Money, Berlin 1976.
- Friedrich von Schrötter (ed.) with N. Bauer, K. Regling, A. Suhle, R. Vasmer, J. Wilcke: Dictionary of Numismatics, de Gruyter, Berlin 1970 (Reprint of the original edition from 1930).
- Heinz Fengler, Gerd Gierow, Willy Unger: transpress Lexicon Numismatics, Berlin 1976.
- Helmut Kahnt: The Great Coin Lexicon from A to Z, Regenstauf 2005.
- Kurt Jäger: The German Coins since 1871, 17th revised edition, edited by Helmut Kahnt, Regenstauf 2001. Therein: State Emergency Coins, Westphalia N 9 to 29.
- Werner Conze and Volker Hentschel (eds.): German History, Epochs and Data, Freiburg/Würzburg 1991.
