= Porcelain money =

Coinage made from ceramics

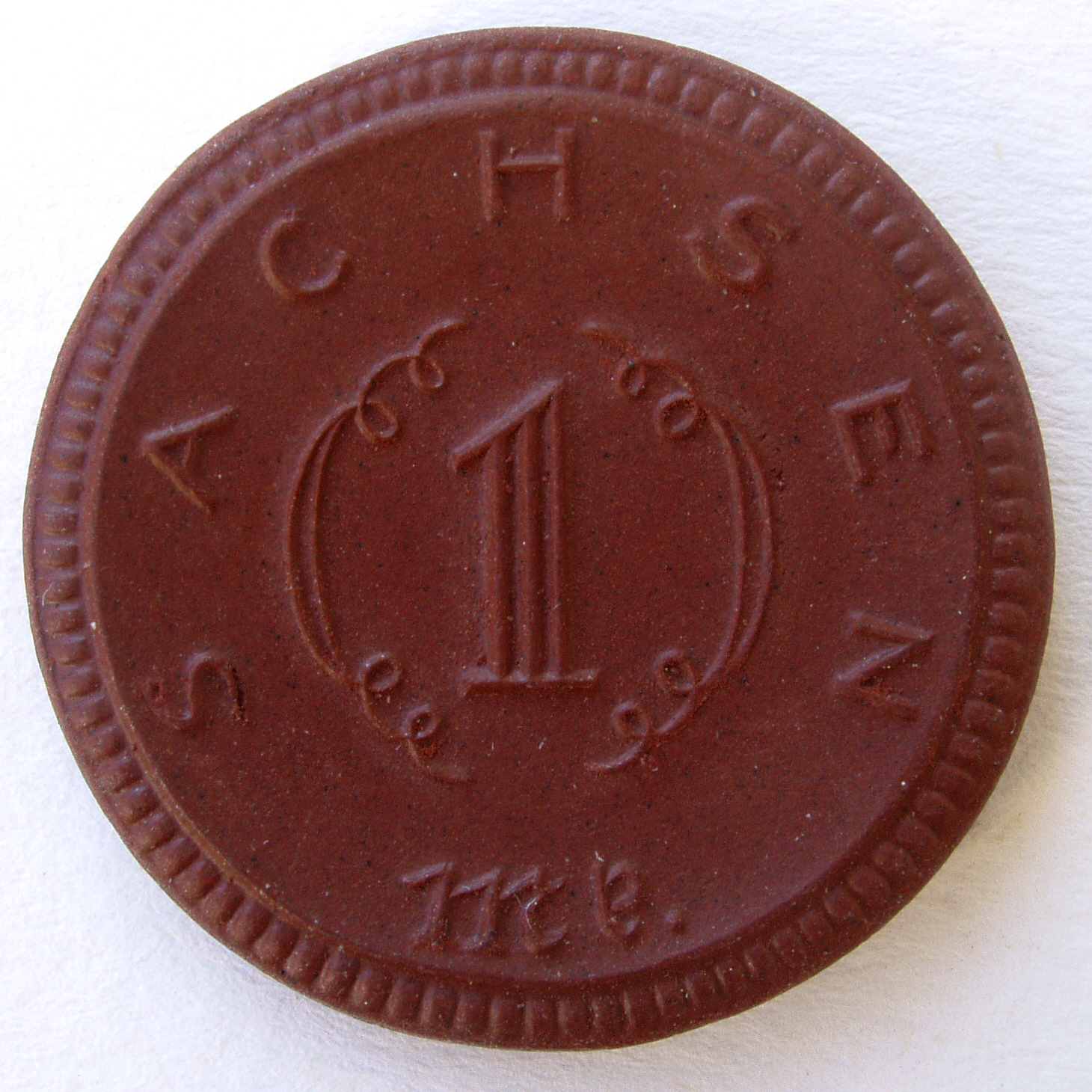
German local "emergency money", Saxony, 1921

Porcelain money are coins and tokens made of porcelain intended for economic exchange. These include German Notgeld struck between 1921 and 1923, and the gambling tokens used as petty coinage in Siam with Chinese characters.

== German Notgeld ==
The German porcelain Notgeld were made between 1915 and 1923, in the years before the German Hyperinflation, and a shortage of small change. Most of the porcelain Notgeld were produced for collectors in sets, which were struck in Meissen, Saxony, from 1921 to 1923.

Most of these coins were made in red Böttger stoneware, but also in white porcelain. Some of them are partly gilt. They were issued for the province Saxony in the cities Meissen and Freiberg, the state of Thuringia in the city of Eisenach, in Silesia in the city of Münsterberg, and in Saxony-Anhalt in the city of Quedlinburg. Building on the popularity of these tokens, Meissen continued to strike Medals in porcelain and stoneware.

== Siamese gambling tokens ==
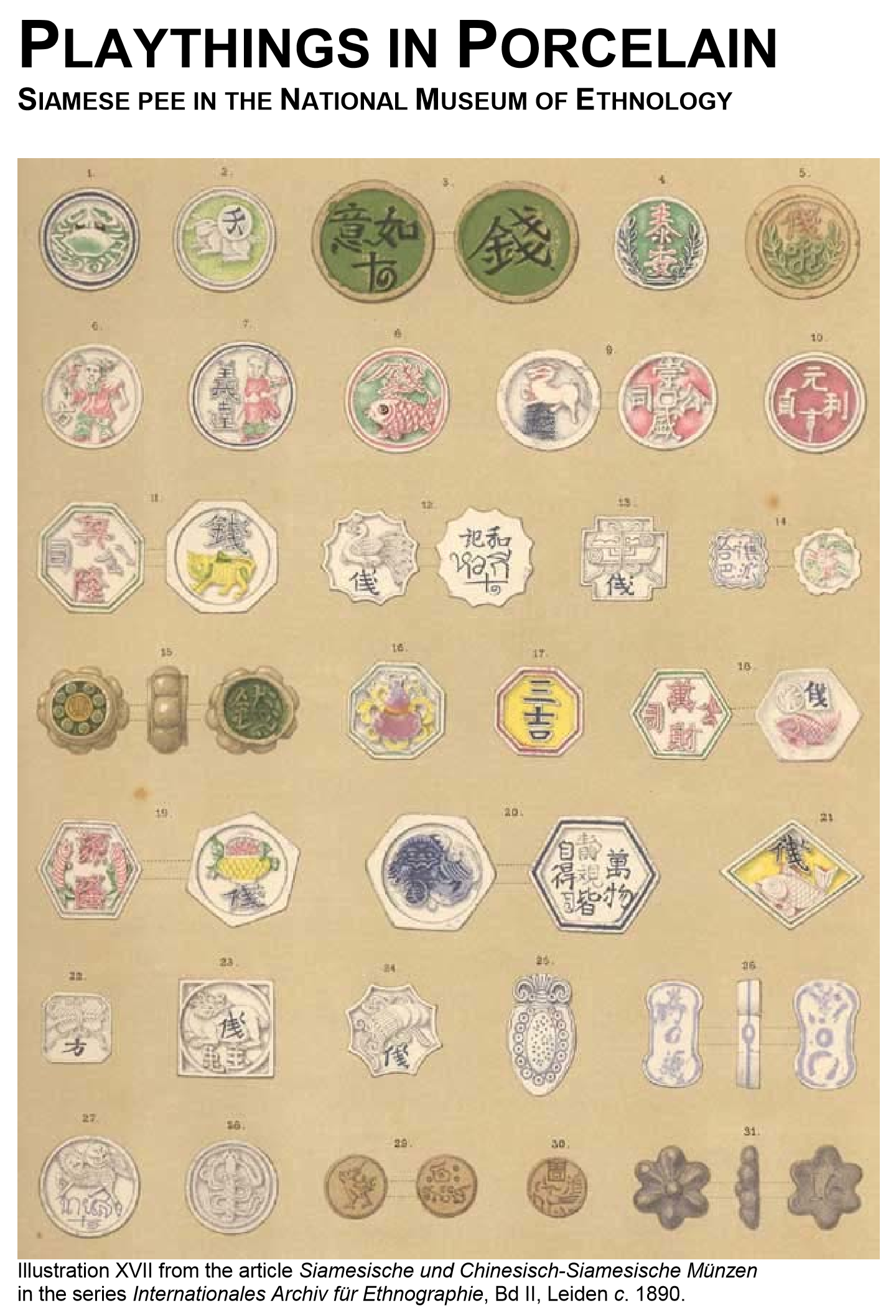
Thai porcelain tokens

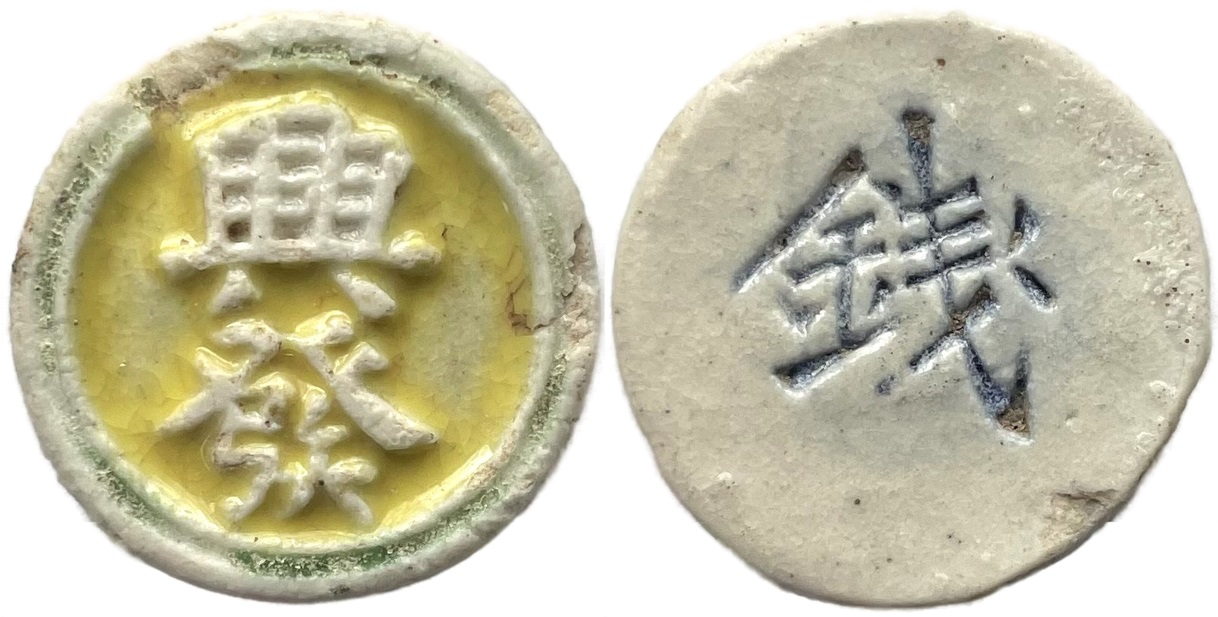
Siamese porcelain token, Xing Fa 興發, Qian/Salung 錢

Also known as "Thai porcelain tokens" or "pee" (Chinese: 暹罗陶瓷代币 Xiānluó táocí dàibì), (Note: "Pee" is a form of the Pinyin 币 bì. They should, strictly speaking, be called bi. Others say that they should be called pi from the character 鈚, from the Chinese Chaozhu dialect word meaning 'a token'.) originally tokens for gambling, these small porcelain tokens became popular as petty coinage. They were made in a variety of forms: round, square, and rectangular. Some have inscriptions in Chinese or Thai, some have a pictorial design. There are several collections of these in museums around the world, including the British Museum, the Wereldmuseum Leiden, the Sammlung Köhler-Osbahr (Duisburg).

== Malaysian clay gaming tokens ==
These were issued in Chinese settlements in the Malay states, for use in gaming establishments, and then as currency. The early tokens were imported from Siam, and over time they were also made locally. The tokens were easy and cheap to produce. To deal with large-scale counterfeiting, licensed issuers would change the designs frequently. This eventually led to the appearance of a new type of gambling counter, called jokoh.
