= Oroide =

Copper alloy

Oroide is an inexpensive copper alloy with a gold-like appearance used in coins or for decorative purposes where a gold-colored metal is desirable. Oroide may be brass (an alloy of copper and zinc), bronze (an alloy of copper and in modern times tin), or other gold-colored copper alloy. Oroide may also be known as goldene or goldine.

== See also ==
- Iron pyrite, a non-oroide mineral sometimes referred to as "fool's gold"
- Nordic gold, a similar gold-colored alloy
