= Melchior (alloy) =

Copper alloy

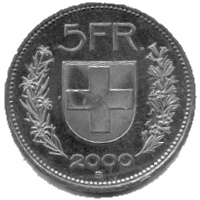
5 Swiss francs

In metallurgy, melchior is an alloy of copper, mainly with nickel (5–30%). Its name originates from Italian: melchior, which in turn is distorted French: maillechort, honoring the French inventors of the alloy, Maillot and Chorier. The term melchior sometimes refers not only to the copper-nickel alloys, but also ternary alloys of copper with nickel and zinc ("nickel silver") and even a silvered brass. Melchior is easily deformable by application of pressure, both in the hot and cold state. After annealing, it has a tensile strength of about 40 kg/mm^{2}. The most valuable property of melchior is its high resistance to corrosion in air, freshwater and seawater. Increasing the amount of nickel, iron or manganese improves corrosion and cavitation resistance, especially in sea water and atmospheric water vapor. The alloy of 30% Ni, 0.8% Fe, 1% Mn and 68.2% Cu is used in maritime shipping, in particular for the manufacture of condenser tubes. Nickel gives melchior, unlike brass and bronze, a silver color, and that property, combined with its high corrosion resistance, made it popular for the manufacture of household utensils in the Soviet Union.

== See also ==
- Cupronickel
- Monel
