= Metal =

Type of material

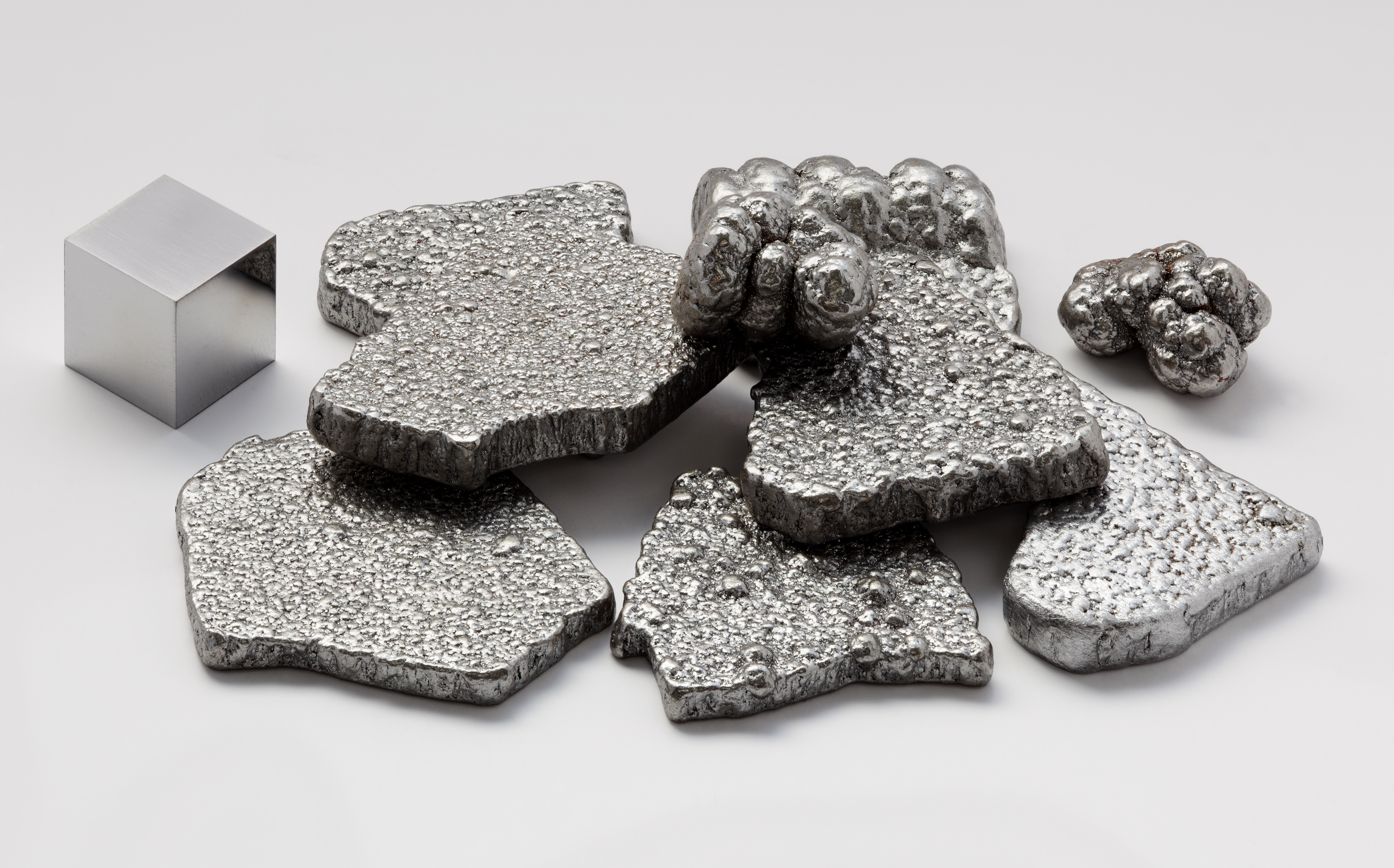
Iron, shown here as fragments and a 1 cm^{3} cube, is an example of a chemical element that is a metal.

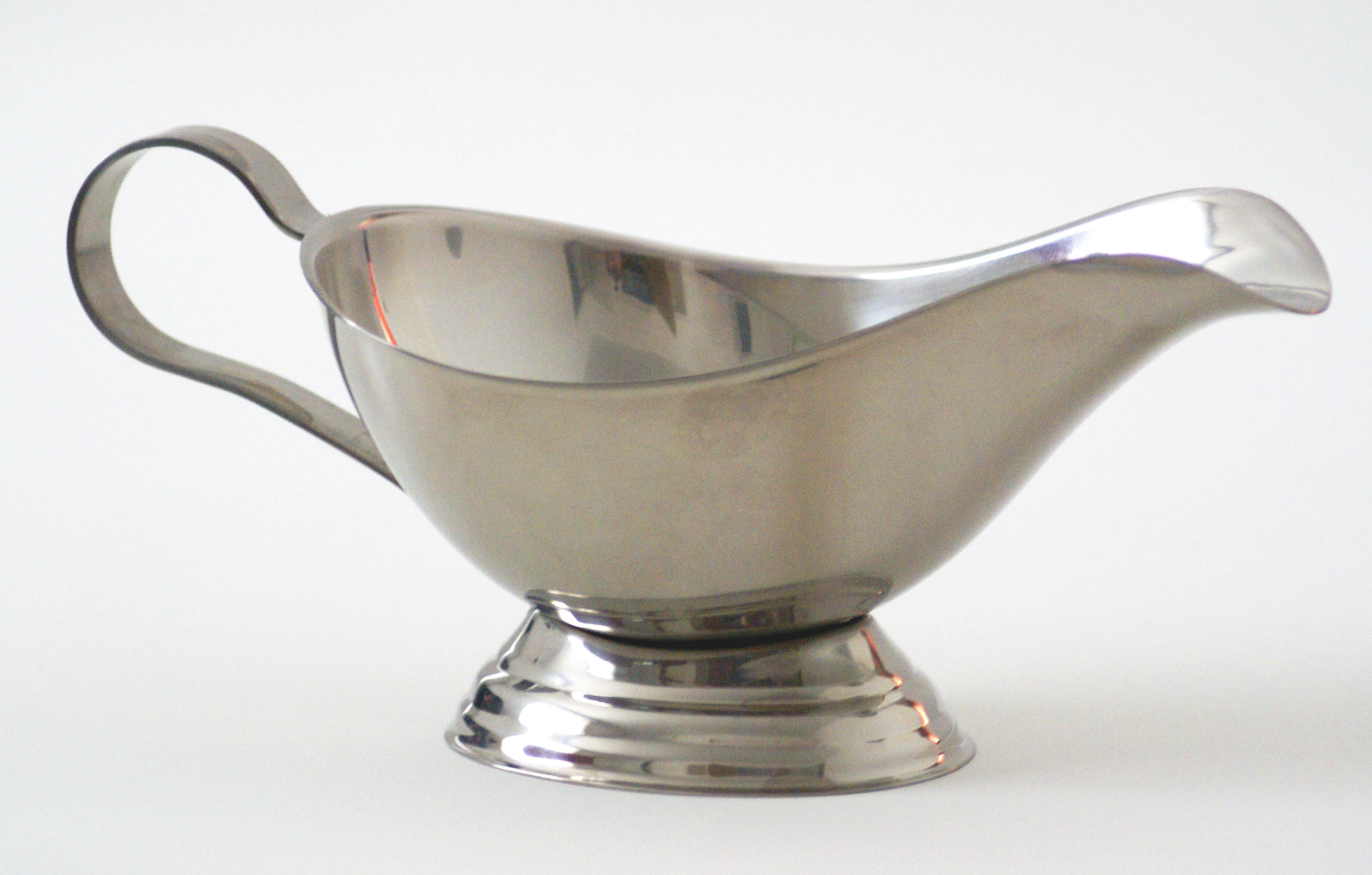
Metal in the form of a gravy boat made from stainless steel, an alloy largely composed of iron, chromium and nickel

A metal (from Ancient Greek μέταλλον (métallon) 'mine, quarry, metal') is a material that, when polished or fractured, shows a lustrous appearance, and conducts electricity and heat relatively well. These properties are all associated with having electrons available at the Fermi level, as opposed to nonmetallic materials which do not. Metals are typically ductile (can be drawn into a wire) and malleable (can be shaped via hammering or pressing).

A metal may be a chemical element, such as iron, an alloy, such as stainless steel, or a molecular compound, such as polymeric sulfur nitride. The general science of metals is called metallurgy, a subtopic of materials science; aspects of their electronic and thermal properties are also within the scope of condensed matter physics and solid-state chemistry, as it is a multidisciplinary topic. In colloquial use, materials such as steel alloys are referred to as metals, while others, such as polymers, wood, or ceramics are nonmetallic materials.

A metal conducts electricity at a temperature of absolute zero, which is a consequence of delocalized states at the Fermi energy. Many elements and compounds become metallic under high pressures; for example, iodine gradually becomes a metal at a pressure between 40 and 170 thousand times atmospheric.

When discussing the periodic table and some chemical properties, the term metal is often used to denote those elements which in pure form and at standard conditions are metals in the sense of electrical conduction mentioned above. The related term metallic may also be used for types of dopant atoms or alloying elements.

The strength and resilience of some metals have led to their frequent use in, for example, high-rise building and bridge construction, as well as most vehicles, many home appliances, tools, pipes, and railroad tracks. Precious metals were historically used as coinage, but in the modern era, coinage metals have extended to at least 23 of the chemical elements. There is also extensive use of multi-element metals such as titanium nitride or degenerate semiconductors in the semiconductor industry.

The history of refined metals is thought to begin with the use of copper about 11,000 years ago. Gold, silver, iron (as meteoric iron), lead, and brass were likewise in use before the first known appearance of bronze in the fifth millennium BCE. Subsequent developments include the production of early forms of steel; the discovery of sodium—the first light metal—in 1809; the rise of modern alloy steels; and, since the end of World War II, the development of more sophisticated alloys.

== Properties ==
=== Form and structure ===
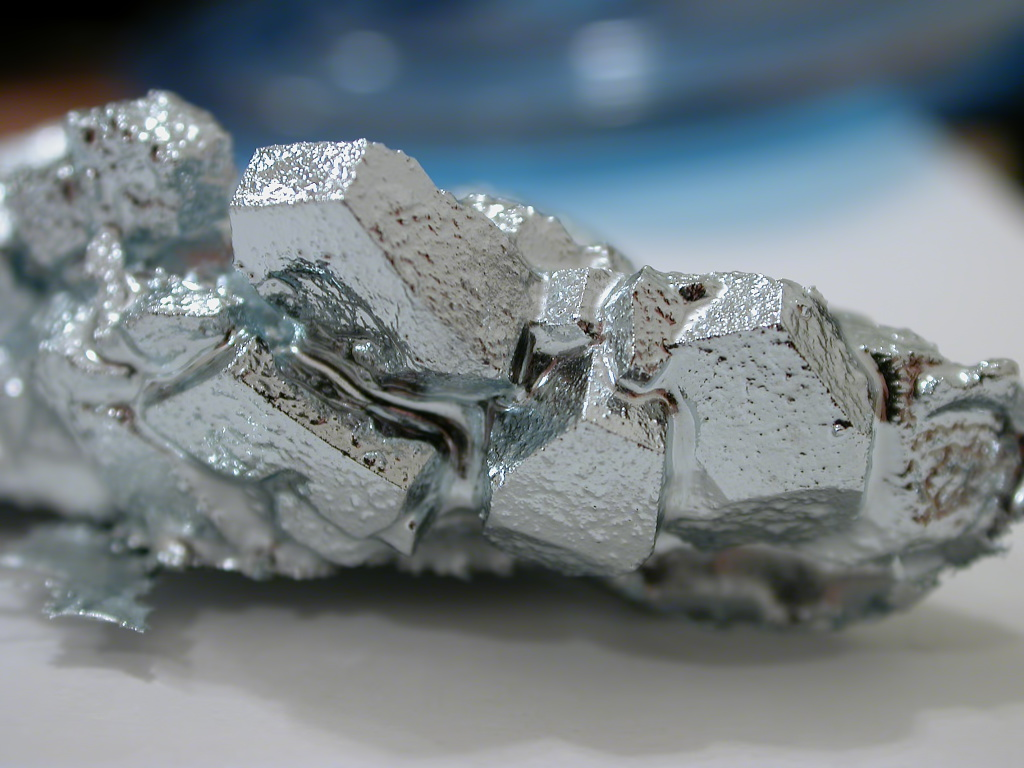
Gallium crystals

Most metals are shiny and lustrous, at least when polished or fractured. Sheets of metal thicker than a few micrometres appear opaque, but gold leaf transmits green light. This is due to the freely moving electrons which reflect light.

Although most elemental metals have higher densities than nonmetals, there is a wide variation in their densities, lithium being the least dense (0.534 g/cm^{3}) and osmium (22.59 g/cm^{3}) the most dense. Some of the 6d transition metals are expected to be denser than osmium, but their known isotopes are too unstable for bulk production to be possible. Magnesium, aluminium and titanium are light metals of significant commercial importance. Their respective densities of 1.7, 2.7, and 4.5 g/cm^{3} can be compared to those of the older structural metals, like iron at 7.9 and copper at 8.9 g/cm^{3}. The most common lightweight metals are aluminium and magnesium alloys.

Schematic appearance of round metal bars after tensile testing. (a) Brittle fracture (b) Ductile fracture (c) Completely ductile fracture

Metals are typically malleable and ductile, deforming under stress without cleaving. The nondirectional nature of metallic bonding contributes to the ductility of most metallic solids, where the Peierls stress is relatively low allowing for dislocation motion, and there are also many combinations of planes and directions for plastic deformation. Due to their having close packed arrangements of atoms the Burgers vector of the dislocations are fairly small, which also means that the energy needed to produce one is small. In contrast, in an ionic compound like table salt, the Burgers vectors are much larger and the energy to move a dislocation is far higher. Reversible elastic deformation in metals can be described well by Hooke's law for the restoring forces, where the stress is linearly proportional to the strain, up to the proportional limit of the material.

A temperature change may lead to the movement of structural defects in the metal such as grain boundaries, point vacancies, line and screw dislocations, stacking faults and twins in both crystalline and non-crystalline metals. Internal slip, creep, and metal fatigue may also ensue.

The atoms of simple metallic substances are often in one of three common crystal structures, namely body-centered cubic (bcc), face-centered cubic (fcc), and hexagonal close-packed (hcp). In bcc, each atom is positioned at the center of a cube of eight others. In fcc and hcp, each atom is surrounded by twelve others, but the stacking of the layers differs. Some metals adopt different structures depending on the temperature.

Body-centered cubic crystal structure, with a 2-atom unit cell, as found in e.g. chromium, iron, and tungsten

Face-centered cubic crystal structure, with a 4-atom unit cell, as found in e.g. aluminium, copper, and gold

Hexagonal close-packed crystal structure, with a 6-atom unit cell, as found in e.g. titanium, cobalt, and zinc

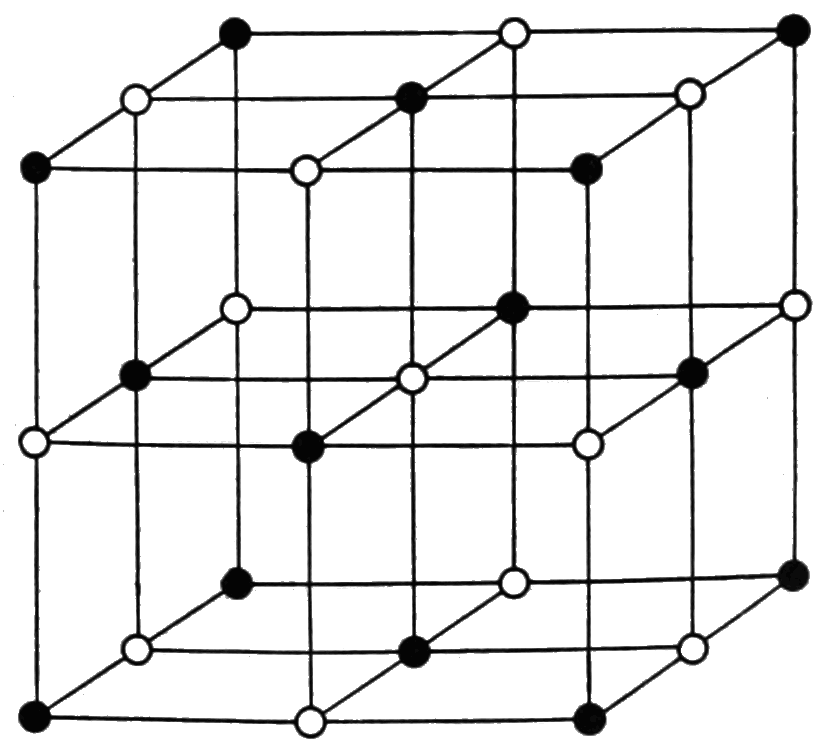
Arrangement of atoms in a rock salt crystal such as TiN

Many other metals with different elements have more complicated structures, such as rock-salt structure in titanium nitride or perovskite (structure) in some nickelates.

=== Electrical and thermal ===
The energy states available to electrons in different kinds of solids at thermodynamic equilibrium. Here, height is energy while width is the density of available states for a certain energy in the material listed. The shading follows the Fermi–Dirac distribution (black=all states filled, white=no state filled). The Fermi level E_{F} is the energy level at which the electrons are in a position to interact with energy levels above them. In metals and semimetals the Fermi level E_{F} lies inside at least one band of energy states. In insulators and semiconductors the Fermi level is inside a band gap; however, in semiconductors the bands are near enough to the Fermi level to be thermally populated with electrons or holes.

The electronic structure of metals makes them good conductors of electricity. In general, electrons in a material all have different momenta, which average to zero when there is no external voltage. In metals, when a voltage is applied, some electrons shift to states with slightly higher momentum in the direction of the electric field, while others slow down slightly. This creates a net drift velocity that leads to an electric current. This involves small changes in which wavefunctions the electrons are in, changing to those with the higher momenta. According to the Pauli exclusion principle, no two electrons can occupy the same quantum state. Therefore, for the electrons to shift to higher-momentum states, such states must be unoccupied. In metals, these empty delocalized electron states are available at energies near the highest occupied levels, as shown in the Figure.

By contrast, semiconductors like silicon and nonmetals like strontium titanate have an energy gap between the highest filled electron states (the valence band) and the lowest empty states (the conduction band). A small electric field is insufficient to excite electrons across this gap, making these materials poor electrical conductors. However, semiconductors can carry some current when doped with elements that introduce additional partially occupied energy states, or when thermal excitation enables electrons to cross the energy gap.

The elemental metals have electrical conductivity values of from 6.9 × 10^{3} S/cm for manganese to 6.3 × 10^{5} S/cm for silver. In contrast, a semiconducting metalloid such as boron has an electrical conductivity 1.5 × 10^{−6} S/cm. Typically, the electrical conductivity of metals decreases with heating because the increased thermal motion of the atoms makes it harder for electrons to flow. Exceptionally, plutonium's electrical conductivity increases when heated in the temperature range of around −175 to +125 °C, with anomalously large thermal expansion coefficient and a phase change from monoclinic to face-centered cubic near 100 °C. This behavior, along with similar phenomena observed in other transuranic elements, is attributed to more complex relativistic and spin interactions which are not captured in simple models.

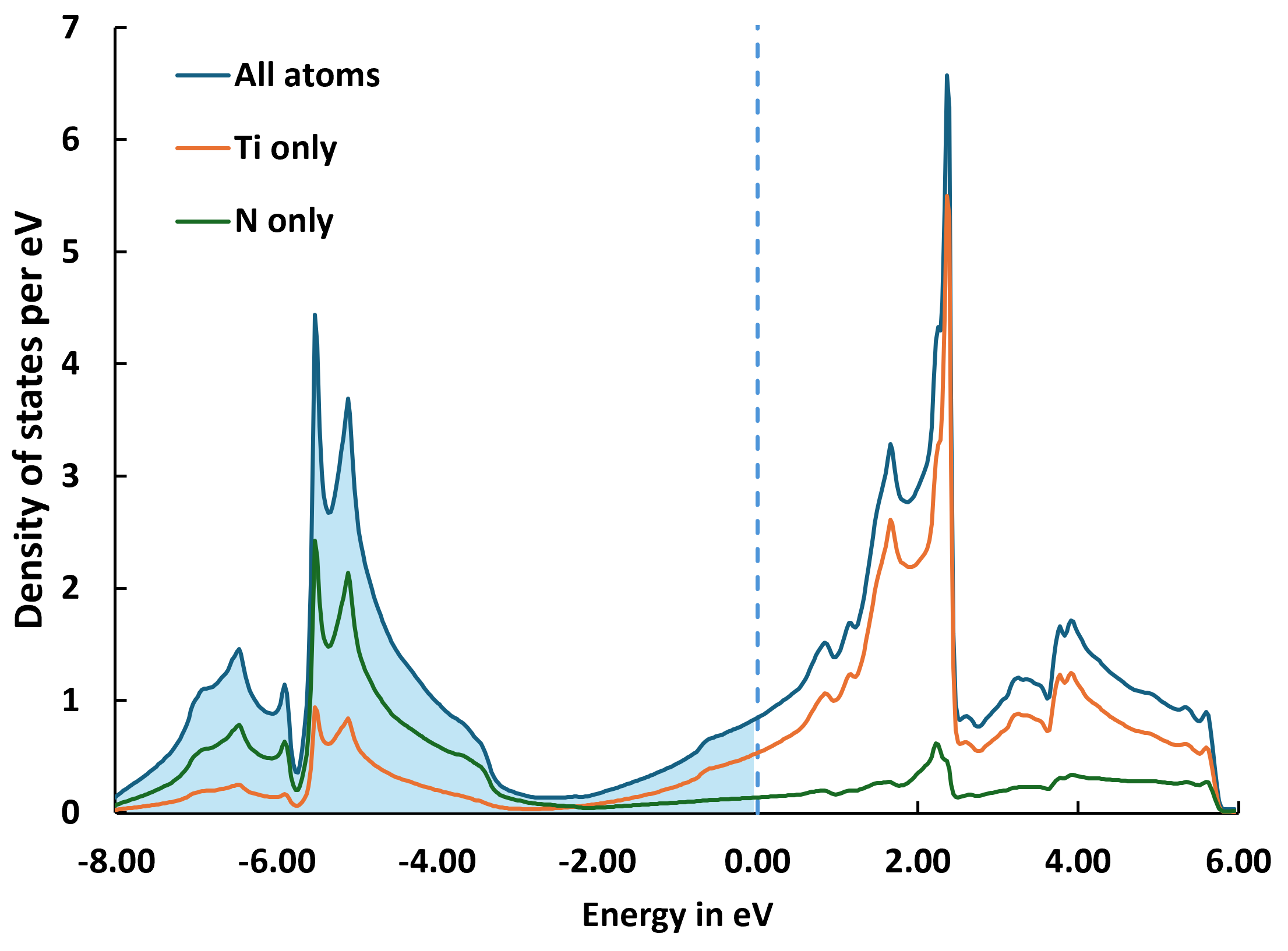
Density of states of TiN, with the occupied states shaded in blue and the Fermi level at the x origin. All the states, as well as those associated with the Ti and N atoms are shown.

All of the metallic alloys as well as conducting ceramics and polymers are metals by the same definition; for instance titanium nitride has delocalized states at the Fermi level. They have electrical conductivities similar to those of elemental metals. Liquid forms are also metallic conductors of electricity, for instance mercury. In normal conditions no gases are metallic conductors. However, a plasma is a metallic conductor and the charged particles in a plasma have many properties in common with those of electrons in elemental metals, particularly for white dwarf stars.

Metals are relatively good conductors of heat, which is transported mainly by the conduction electrons. At higher temperatures the electrons can occupy slightly higher energy levels given by Fermi–Dirac statistics. These have slightly higher momenta (kinetic energy) and can pass on thermal energy. The empirical Wiedemann–Franz law states that in many metals the ratio between thermal and electrical conductivities is proportional to temperature, with a proportionality constant that is roughly the same for all metals.

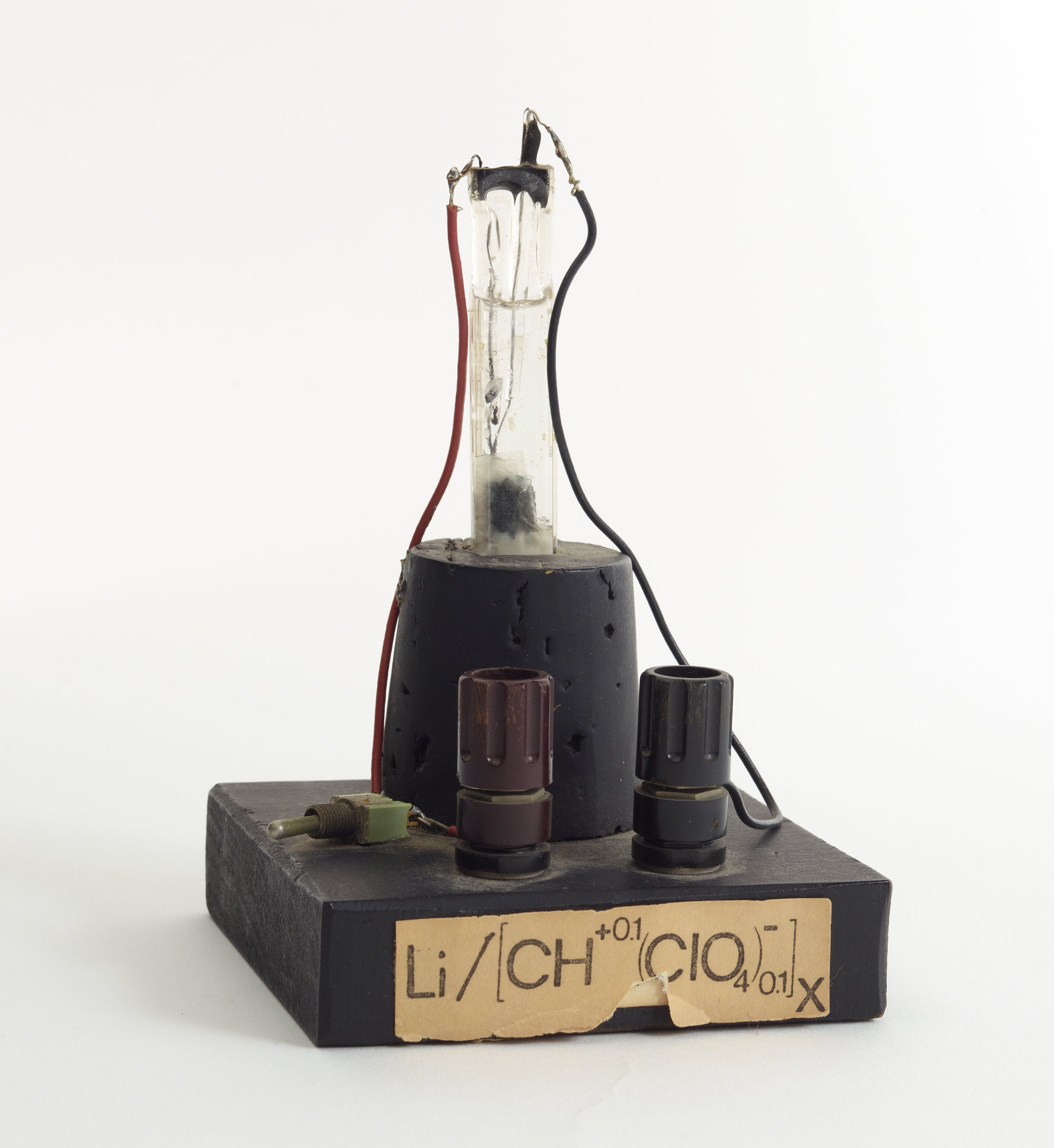
Battery demonstration unit for conducting polymers built by nobel laureate Alan MacDiarmid

The contribution of a metal's electrons to its heat capacity and thermal conductivity, and the electrical conductivity of the metal itself can be approximately calculated from the free electron model. However, this does not take into account the detailed structure of the metal's ion lattice. Taking into account the positive potential caused by the arrangement of the ion cores enables consideration of the electronic band structure and binding energy of a metal. Various models are applicable, the simplest being the nearly free electron model. Modern methods such as density functional theory are typically used.

=== Chemical ===
The elements which form metals usually form cations through electron loss. Most will react with oxygen in the air to form oxides over various timescales (potassium burns in seconds while iron rusts over years) which depend upon whether the native oxide forms a passivation layer that acts as a diffusion barrier. Some others, like palladium, platinum, and gold, do not react with the atmosphere at all; gold can form compounds where it gains an electron (aurides, e.g. caesium auride). The oxides of elemental metals are often basic. However, oxides with very high oxidation states such as CrO_{3}, Mn_{2}O_{7}, and OsO_{4} often have strictly acidic reactions; and oxides of the less electropositive metals such as BeO, Al_{2}O_{3}, and PbO, can display both basic and acidic properties. The latter are termed amphoteric oxides.

== Periodic table distribution of elemental metals ==
The elements that form exclusively metallic structures under ordinary conditions are shown in yellow on the periodic table below. The remaining elements either form covalent network structures (light blue), molecular covalent structures (dark blue), or remain as single atoms (violet). Astatine (At), francium (Fr), and the elements from fermium (Fm) onwards are shown in gray because they are extremely radioactive and have never been produced in bulk. Theoretical and experimental evidence suggests that these uninvestigated elements should be metals, except for oganesson (Og) which DFT calculations indicate would be a semiconductor.

Bonding of simple substances in the periodic table
	1	2															3	4	5	6	7	8	9	10	11	12	13	14	15	16	17	18
Group →
↓ Period
1	H																															He
2	Li	Be																									B	C	N	O	F	Ne
3	Na	Mg																									Al	Si	P	S	Cl	Ar
4	K	Ca															Sc	Ti	V	Cr	Mn	Fe	Co	Ni	Cu	Zn	Ga	Ge	As	Se	Br	Kr
5	Rb	Sr															Y	Zr	Nb	Mo	Tc	Ru	Rh	Pd	Ag	Cd	In	Sn	Sb	Te	I	Xe
6	Cs	Ba	La	Ce	Pr	Nd	Pm	Sm	Eu	Gd	Tb	Dy	Ho	Er	Tm	Yb	Lu	Hf	Ta	W	Re	Os	Ir	Pt	Au	Hg	Tl	Pb	Bi	Po	At	Rn
7	Fr	Ra	Ac	Th	Pa	U	Np	Pu	Am	Cm	Bk	Cf	Es	Fm	Md	No	Lr	Rf	Db	Sg	Bh	Hs	Mt	Ds	Rg	Cn	Nh	Fl	Mc	Lv	Ts	Og

Metallic Network covalent Molecular covalent Single atoms Unknown Background color shows bonding of simple substances in the periodic table. If there are several, the most stable allotrope is considered.

The situation changes with pressure: at extremely high pressures, all elements (and indeed all substances) are expected to metallize. Arsenic (As) has both a stable metallic allotrope and a metastable semiconducting allotrope at standard conditions. A similar situation affects carbon (C): graphite is metallic, but diamond is not.

== Alloys ==
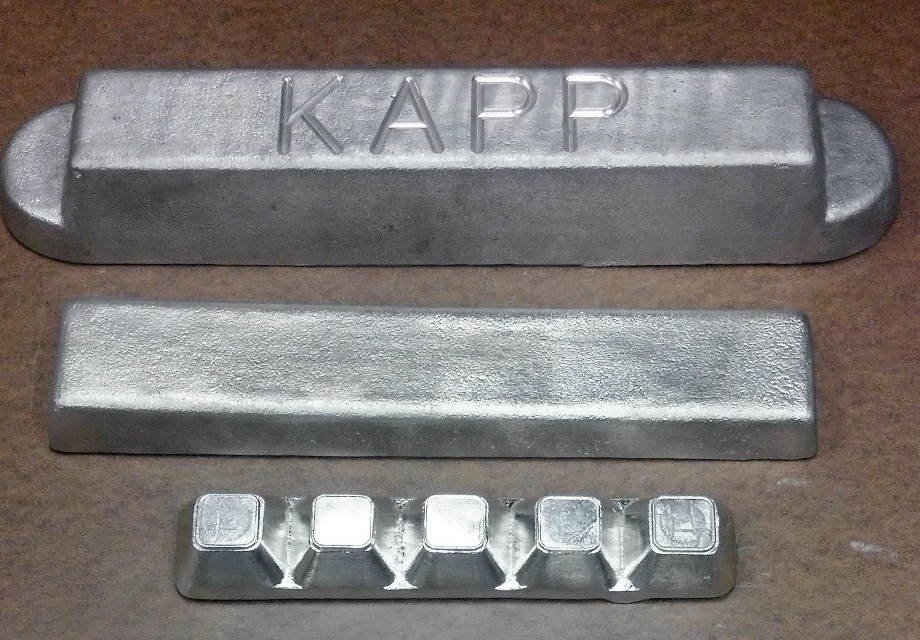
Samples of babbitt metal, an alloy of tin, antimony, and copper, used in bearings to reduce friction

In the context of metals, an alloy is a substance having metallic properties which is composed of two or more elements. Often at least one of these is a metallic element; the term "alloy" is sometimes used more generally as in silicon–germanium alloys. An alloy may have a variable or fixed composition. For example, gold and silver form an alloy in which the proportions of gold or silver can be varied; titanium and silicon form an alloy TiSi_{2} in which the ratio of the two components is fixed (also known as an intermetallic compound).

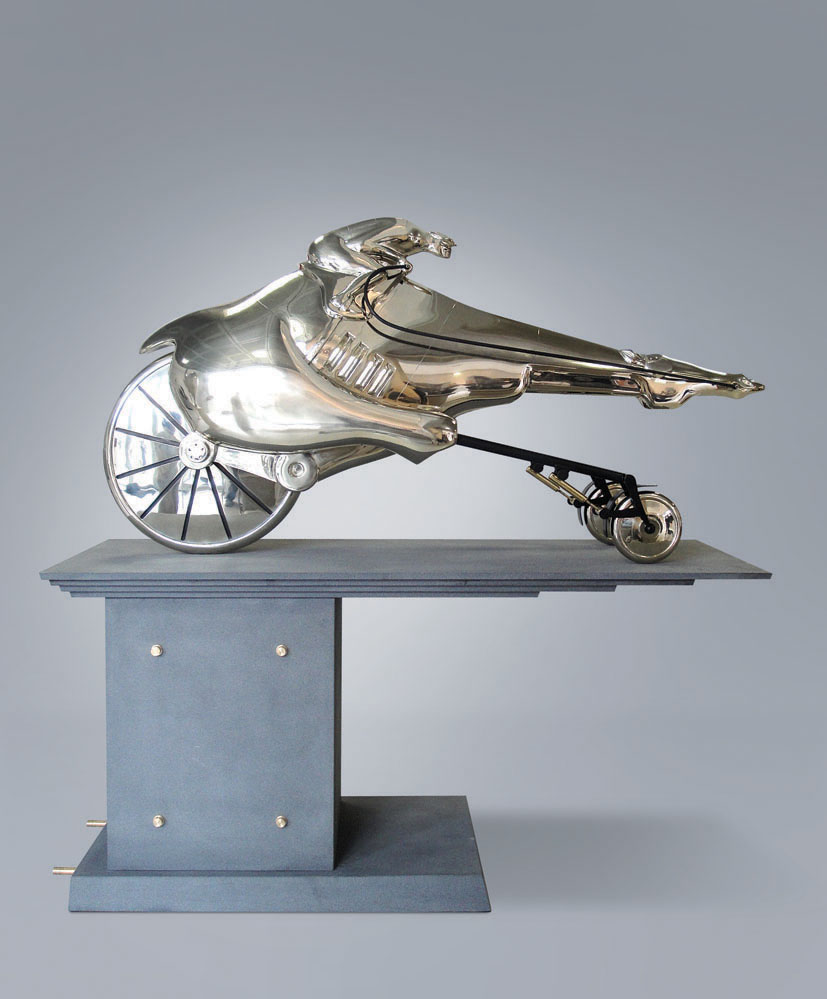
A sculpture cast in nickel silver—an alloy of copper, nickel, and zinc that looks like silver

Most pure metals are either too soft, brittle, or chemically reactive for practical use. Combining different ratios of metals and other elements in alloys modifies the properties to produce desirable characteristics, for instance more ductile, harder, resistant to corrosion, or have a more desirable color and luster. Of all the metallic alloys in use today, the alloys of iron (steel, stainless steel, cast iron, tool steel, alloy steel) make up the largest proportion both by quantity and commercial value. Iron alloyed with various proportions of carbon gives low-, mid-, and high-carbon steels, with increasing carbon levels reducing ductility and toughness. The addition of silicon will produce cast irons, while the addition of chromium, nickel, and molybdenum to carbon steels (more than 10%) results in stainless steels with enhanced corrosion resistance.

Other significant metallic alloys are those of aluminium, titanium, copper, and magnesium. Copper alloys have been known since prehistory—bronze gave the Bronze Age its name—and have many applications today, most importantly in electrical wiring. The alloys of the other three metals have been developed relatively recently; due to their chemical reactivity they need electrolytic extraction processes. The alloys of aluminium, titanium, and magnesium are valued for their high strength-to-weight ratios; magnesium can also provide electromagnetic shielding. These materials are ideal for situations where high strength-to-weight ratio is more important than material cost, such as in aerospace and some automotive applications.

Alloys specially designed for highly demanding applications, such as jet engines, may contain more than ten elements.

== Categories ==
Metals can be categorised by their composition, physical or chemical properties. Categories described in the subsections below include ferrous and non-ferrous metals; brittle metals and refractory metals; white metals; heavy and light metals; base, noble, and precious metals as well as both metallic ceramics and polymers.

=== Ferrous and non-ferrous metals ===
The term "ferrous" is derived from the Latin word meaning "containing iron". This can include pure iron, such as wrought iron, or an alloy such as steel. Ferrous metals are often magnetic, but not exclusively. Non-ferrous metals and alloys lack appreciable amounts of iron.

=== Brittle elemental metal ===
While nearly all elemental metals are malleable or ductile, a few—beryllium, chromium, manganese, gallium, and bismuth—are brittle. Arsenic and antimony, if admitted as metals, are brittle. Low values of the ratio of bulk elastic modulus to shear modulus (Pugh's criterion) are indicative of intrinsic brittleness. A material is brittle if it is hard for dislocations to move, which is often associated with large Burgers vectors and only a limited number of slip planes.

=== Refractory metal ===
A refractory metal is a metal that is very resistant to heat and wear. Which metals belong to this category varies; the most common definition includes niobium, molybdenum, tantalum, tungsten, and rhenium as well as their alloys. They all have melting points above 2000 °C, and a high hardness at room temperature. Several compounds such as titanium nitride are also described as refractory metals.

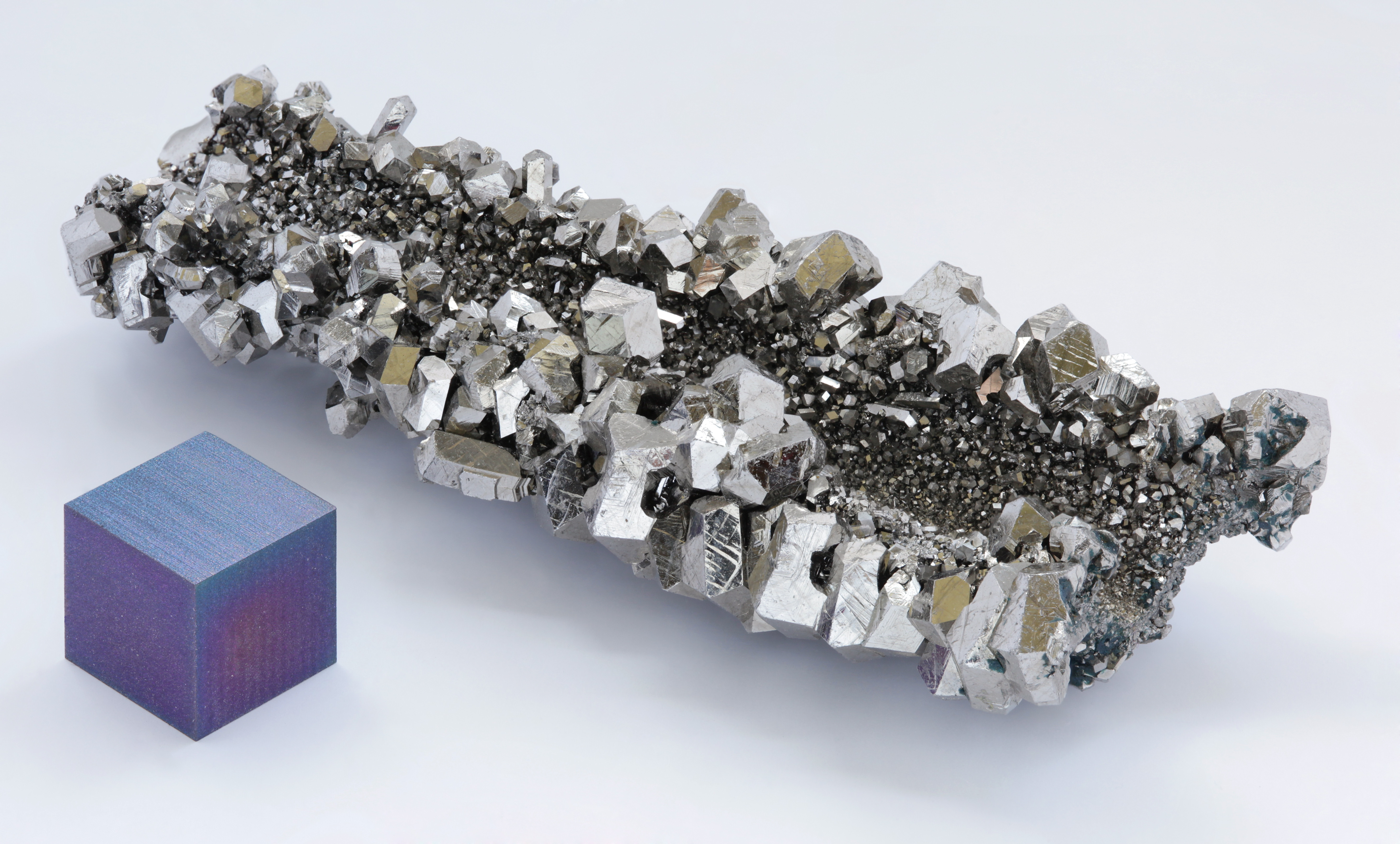
Niobium crystals and a 1 cm^{3} anodized niobium cube for comparison

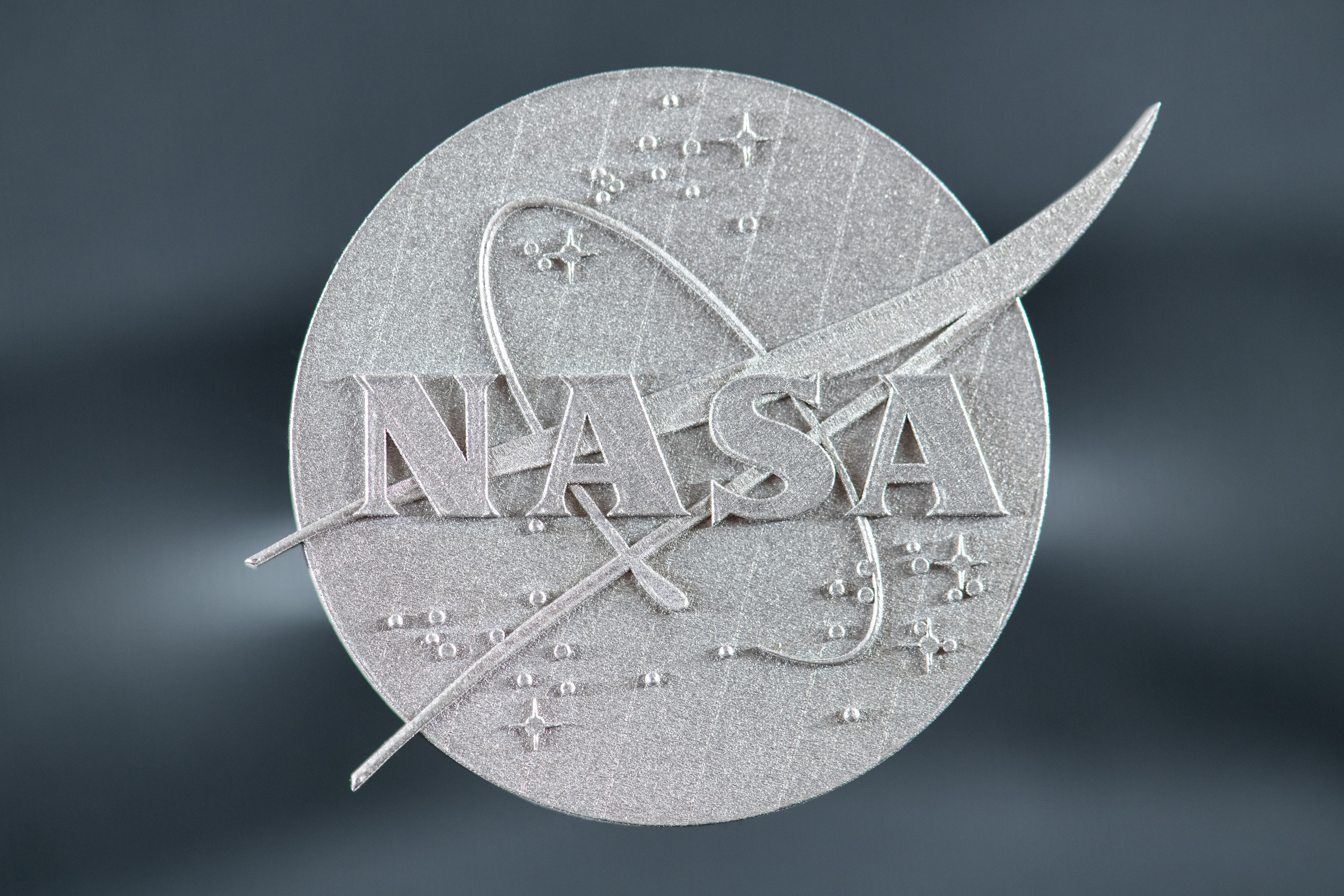
3D print of NASA meatball, made out of GRX-810, an oxide dispersion strengthened high temperature alloy

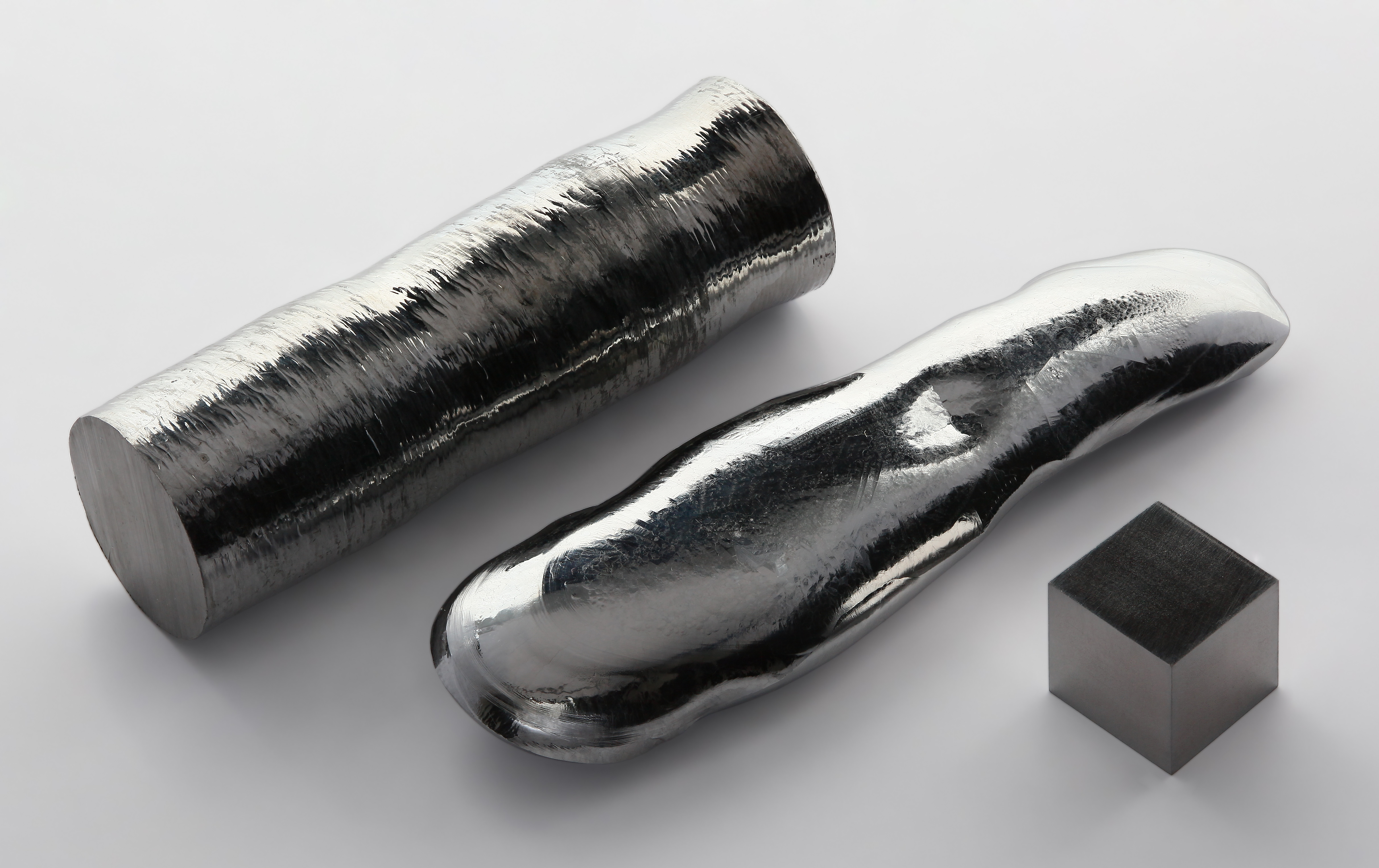
Rhenium single crystal, a remelted bar, and a 1 cm^{3} rhenium cube for comparison

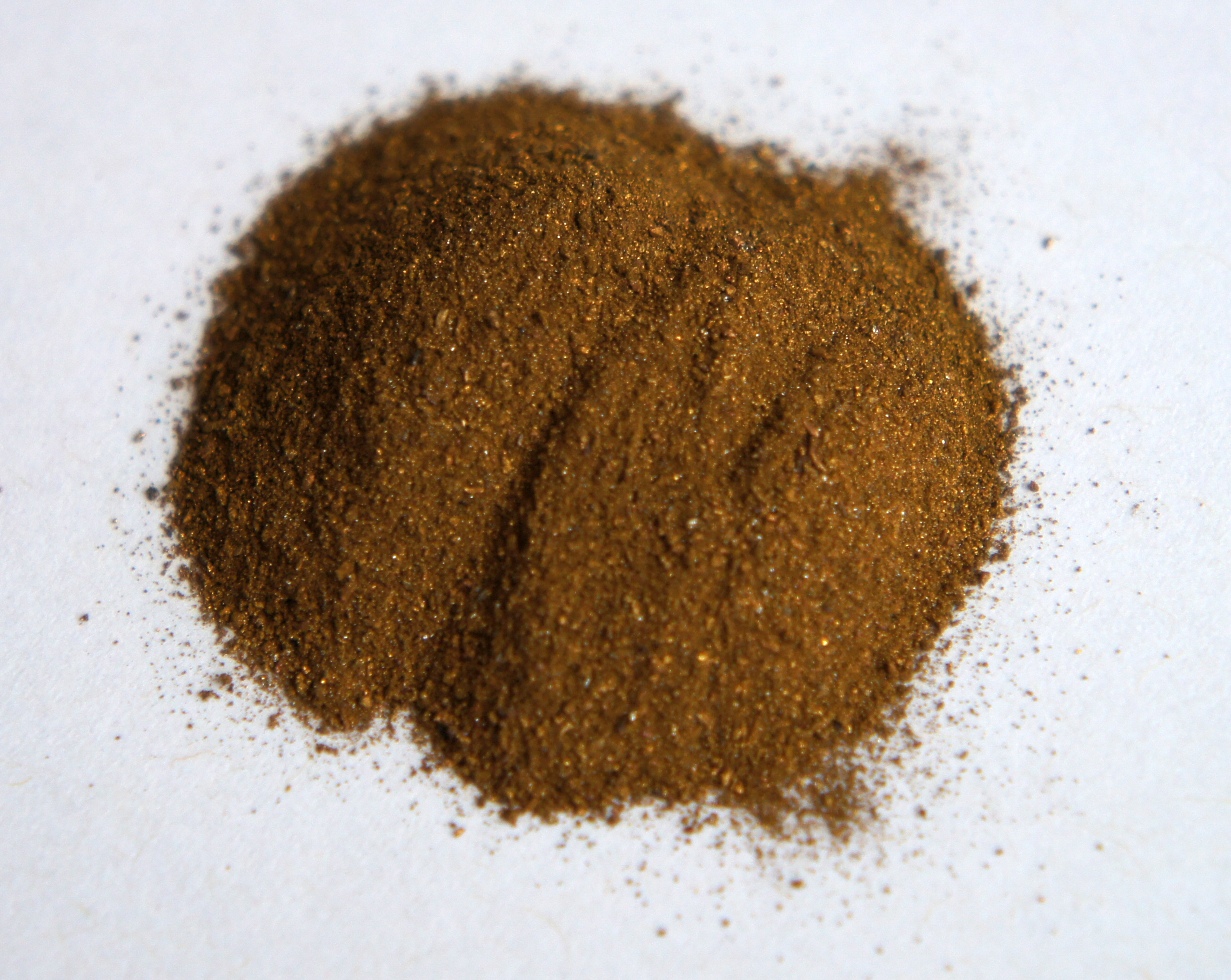
Titanium nitride powder

=== White metal ===
A white metal is any of a range of white-colored alloys with relatively low melting points used mainly for decorative purposes. In Britain, the fine art trade uses the term "white metal" in auction catalogues to describe foreign silver items which do not carry British Assay Office marks, but which are nonetheless understood to be silver and are priced accordingly.

=== Heavy and light metals ===
A heavy metal is any relatively dense metal, either single element or multielement. Magnesium, aluminium and titanium alloys are light metals of significant commercial importance. Their densities of 1.7, 2.7 and 4.5 g/cm^{3} range from 19 to 56% of the densities of other structural metals, such as iron (7.9) and copper (8.9) and their alloys.

=== Base, noble, and precious metals ===
The term base metal refers to a metal that is easily oxidized or corroded, such as reacting easily with dilute hydrochloric acid (HCl) to form a metal chloride and hydrogen. The term is normally used for the elements, and examples include iron, nickel, lead, and zinc. Copper is considered a base metal as it is oxidized relatively easily, although it does not react with HCl.

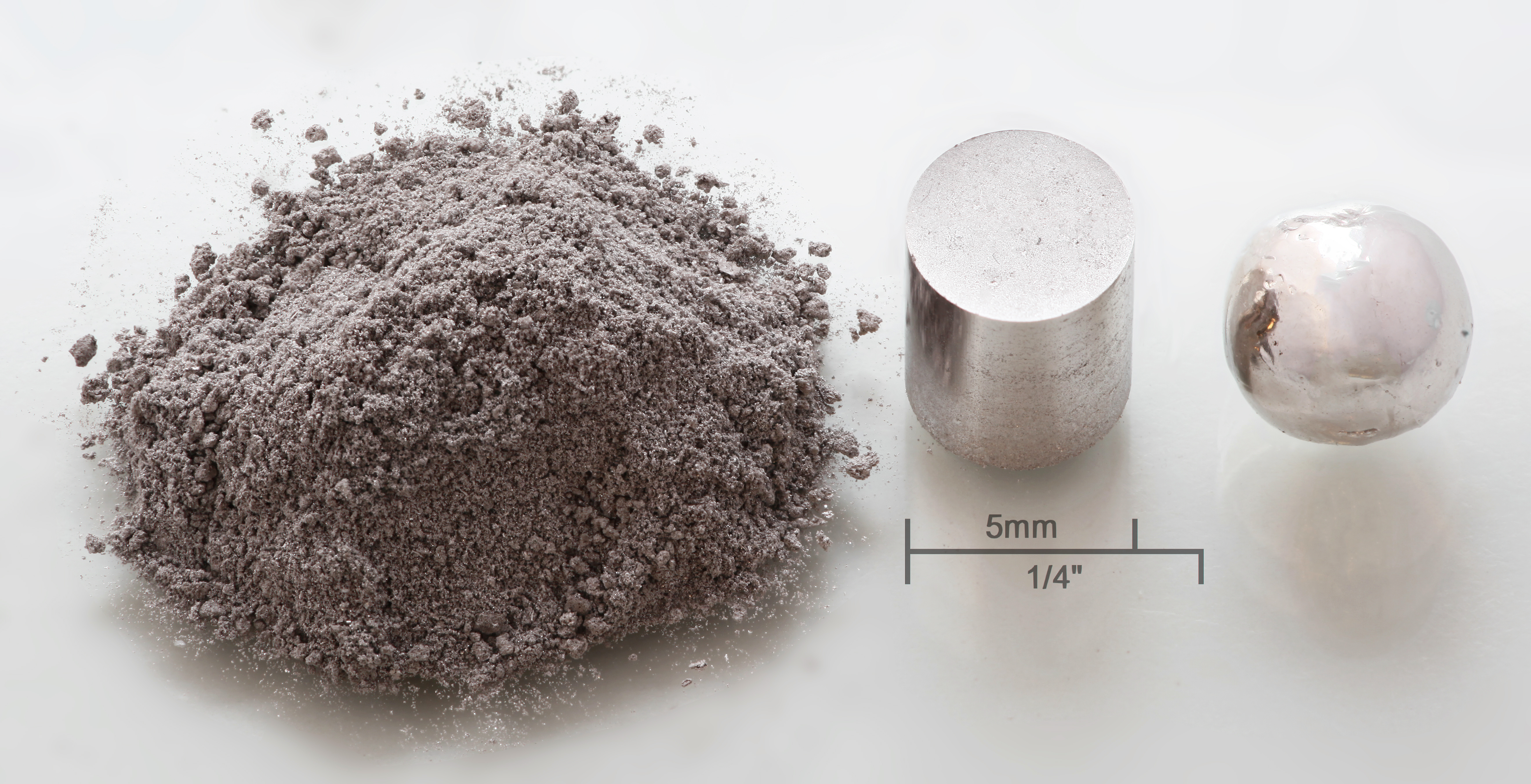
Rhodium, a noble metal, shown here as 1 g of powder, a 1 g pressed cylinder, and a 1 g pellet

The term noble metal (also for elements) is commonly used in opposition to base metal. Noble metals are less reactive, resistant to corrosion or oxidation, unlike most base metals. They tend to be precious metals, often due to perceived rarity. Examples include gold, platinum, silver, rhodium, iridium, and palladium.

In alchemy and numismatics, the term base metal is contrasted with precious metal, that is, those of high economic value. Most coins today are made of base metals with low intrinsic value; in the past, coins frequently derived their value primarily from their precious metal content; gold, silver, platinum, and palladium each have an ISO 4217 currency code. Currently they have industrial uses such as platinum and palladium in catalytic converters, are used in jewellery and also a role as investments and a store of value. Palladium and platinum, as of summer 2024, were valued at slightly less than half the price of gold, while silver is substantially less expensive.

=== Valve metals ===
In electrochemistry, a valve metal is a metal which passes current in only one direction due to the formation of an insulating oxide layer.

=== Metallic ceramics ===
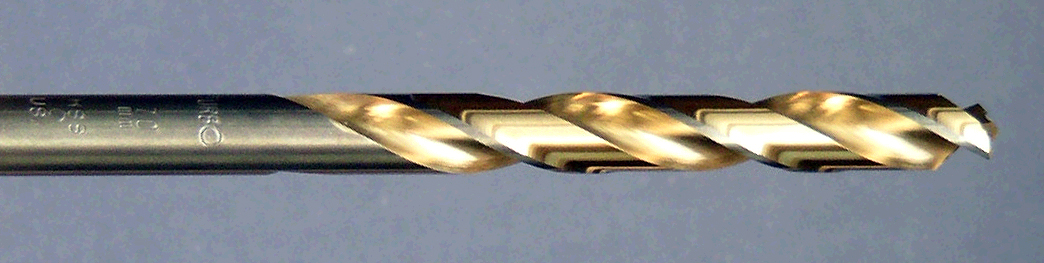
TiN coated drill bit

There are many ceramic compounds which have metallic electrical conduction, but are not simple combinations of metallic elements. (They are not the same as cermets which are composites of a non-conducting ceramic and a conducting metal.) One set, the transition metal nitrides has significant ionic character to the bonding, so can be classified as both ceramics and metals. They have partially filled states at the Fermi level so are good thermal and electrical conductors, and there is often significant charge transfer from the transition metal atoms to the nitrogen. However, unlike most elemental metals, ceramic metals are often not particularly ductile. Their uses are widespread, for instance titanium nitride finds use in orthopedic devices and as a wear resistant coating. In many cases their utility depends upon there being effective deposition methods so they can be used as thin film coatings.

=== Metallic polymers ===
Several of the conducting polymers

There are many polymers which have metallic electrical conduction, typically associated with extended aromatic components such as in the polymers indicated in the Figure. The conduction of the aromatic regions is similar to that of graphite, so is highly directional.

=== Half metal ===
A half-metal is any substance that acts as a conductor to electrons of one spin orientation, but as an insulator or semiconductor to those of the opposite spin. They were first described in 1983, as an explanation for the electrical properties of manganese-based Heusler alloys. Although all half-metals are ferromagnetic (or ferrimagnetic), most ferromagnets are not half-metals. Many of the known examples of half-metals are oxides, sulfides, or Heusler alloys.

=== Semimetal ===
A semimetal is a material with a small energy overlap between the bottom of the conduction band and the top of the valence band, but they do not overlap in momentum space. Unlike a regular metal, semimetals have charge carriers of both types (holes and electrons), although the charge carriers typically occur in much smaller numbers than in a real metal. In this respect they resemble degenerate semiconductors. This explains why the electrical properties of semimetals are partway between those of metals and semiconductors. There are additional types, in particular Weyl and Dirac semimetals.

The classic elemental semimetallic elements are arsenic, antimony, bismuth, α-tin (gray tin) and graphite. There are also chemical compounds, such as mercury telluride (HgTe), and some conductive polymers.

== Lifecycle ==
=== Formation ===
Metals in the Earth's crust:
abundance and main occurrence or source, by weight (Note: Trace elements having an abundance equalling or much less than one part per trillion (namely Tc, Pm, Po, At, Ra, Ac, Pa, Np, and Pu) are not shown.)
	1	2		3	4	5	6	7	8	9	10	11	12	13	14	15	16	17	18
1	H																		He
2	Li	Be												B	C	N	O	F	Ne
3	Na	Mg												Al	Si	P	S	Cl	Ar
4	K	Ca		Sc	Ti	V	Cr	Mn	Fe	Co	Ni	Cu	Zn	Ga	Ge	As	Se	Br	Kr
5	Rb	Sr		Y	Zr	Nb	Mo		Ru	Rh	Pd	Ag	Cd	In	Sn	Sb	Te	I	Xe
6	Cs	Ba	1 asterisk	Lu	Hf	Ta	W	Re	Os	Ir	Pt	Au	Hg	Tl	Pb	Bi
7			1 asterisk
			1 asterisk	La	Ce	Pr	Nd		Sm	Eu	Gd	Tb	Dy	Ho	Er	Tm	Yb
			1 asterisk		Th		U
Most abundant (up to 82000 ppm)
Abundant (100–999 ppm)
Uncommon (1–99 ppm)
Rare (0.01–0.99 ppm)
Very rare (0.0001–0.0099 ppm)
Metals left of the dividing line occur (or are sourced) mainly as lithophiles; those to the right, as chalcophiles except gold (a siderophile) and tin (a lithophile).

Metallic elements up to the vicinity of iron (in the periodic table) are largely made via stellar nucleosynthesis. In this process, lighter elements from hydrogen to silicon undergo successive fusion reactions inside stars, releasing light and heat and forming heavier elements with higher atomic numbers.

Heavier elements are not usually formed this way since fusion reactions involving such nuclei would consume rather than release energy. Rather, they are largely synthesised (from elements with a lower atomic number) by neutron capture, with the two main modes of this repetitive capture being the s-process and the r-process. In the s-process ("s" stands for "slow"), singular captures are separated by years or decades, allowing the less stable nuclei to beta decay, while in the r-process ("rapid"), captures happen faster than nuclei can decay. Therefore the s-process takes a more-or-less clear path: for example, stable cadmium-110 nuclei are successively bombarded by free neutrons inside a star until they form cadmium-115 nuclei which are unstable and decay to form indium-115 (which is nearly stable, with a half-life 30000 times the age of the universe). These nuclei capture neutrons and form indium-116, which is unstable, and decays to form tin-116, and so on. (Note: In some cases, for example in the presence of high energy gamma rays or in a very high temperature hydrogen rich environment, the subject nuclei may experience neutron loss or proton gain resulting in the production of (comparatively rare) neutron deficient isotopes.) In contrast, there is no such path in the r-process. The s-process stops at bismuth due to the short half-lives of the next two elements, polonium and astatine, which decay to bismuth or lead. The r-process is so fast it can skip this zone of instability and go on to create heavier elements such as thorium and uranium.

Metals condense in planets as a result of stellar evolution and destruction processes. Stars lose much of their mass when it is ejected late in their lifetimes, and sometimes thereafter as a result of a neutron star merger, (Note: The ejection of matter when two neutron stars collide is attributed to the interaction of their tidal forces, possible crustal disruption, and shock heating (which is what happens if you floor the accelerator in a car when the engine is cold).) thereby increasing the abundance of elements heavier than helium in the interstellar medium. When gravitational attraction causes this matter to coalesce and collapse new stars and planets are formed.

=== Abundance and occurrence ===
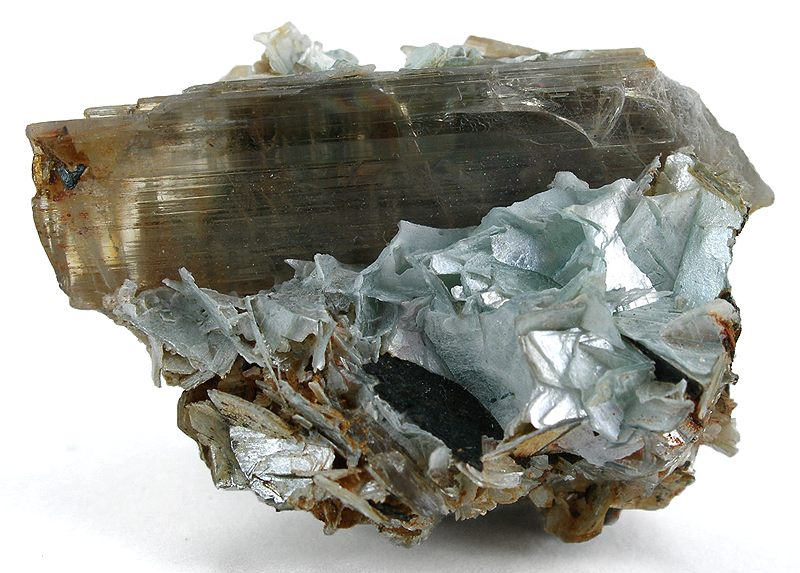
A sample of diaspore, an aluminium oxide hydroxide mineral, α-AlO(OH)

The Earth's crust is made of approximately 25% of metallic elements by weight, of which 80% are light metals such as sodium, magnesium, and aluminium. Despite the overall scarcity of some heavier metals such as copper, they can become concentrated in economically extractable quantities as a result of mountain building, erosion, or other geological processes.

Metallic elements are primarily found as lithophiles (rock-loving) or chalcophiles (ore-loving). Lithophile elements are mainly the s-block elements, the more reactive of the d-block elements, and the f-block elements. They have a strong affinity for oxygen and mostly exist as relatively low-density silicate minerals. Chalcophile elements are mainly the less reactive d-block elements, and the period 4–6 p-block metals. They are usually found in (insoluble) sulfide minerals. Being denser than the lithophiles, hence sinking lower into the crust at the time of its solidification, the chalcophiles tend to be less abundant than the lithophiles.

On the other hand, gold is a siderophile, or iron-loving element. It does not readily form compounds with either oxygen or sulfur. At the time of the Earth's formation, and as the most noble (inert) of metallic elements, gold sank into the core due to its tendency to form high-density metallic alloys. Consequently, it is relatively rare. Some other (less) noble ones—molybdenum, rhenium, the platinum group metals (ruthenium, rhodium, palladium, osmium, iridium, and platinum), germanium, and tin—can be counted as siderophiles but only in terms of their primary occurrence in the Earth (core, mantle, and crust), rather than the crust. These otherwise occur in the crust, in small quantities, chiefly as chalcophiles (less so in their native form). (Note: Iron, cobalt, nickel, and tin are also siderophiles from a whole of Earth perspective.)

The rotating fluid outer core of the Earth's interior, which is composed mostly of iron, is thought to be the source of Earth's protective magnetic field. (Note: Another life-enabling role for iron is as a key constituent of hemoglobin, which enables the transportation of oxygen from the lungs to the rest of the body.) The core lies above Earth's solid inner core and below its mantle. If it could be rearranged into a column having a 5 m^{2} (54 sq ft) footprint it would have a height of nearly 700 light years. The magnetic field shields the Earth from the charged particles of the solar wind, and cosmic rays that would otherwise strip away the upper atmosphere (including the ozone layer that limits the transmission of ultraviolet radiation).

=== Extraction ===
Metallic elements are often extracted from the Earth by mining ores that are rich sources of the requisite elements, such as bauxite. Ores are located by prospecting techniques, followed by the exploration and examination of deposits. Mineral sources are generally divided into surface mines, which are mined by excavation using heavy equipment, and subsurface mines. In some cases, the sale price of the metal(s) involved make it economically feasible to mine lower concentration sources.

Once the ore is mined, the elements must be extracted, usually by chemical or electrolytic reduction. Pyrometallurgy uses high temperatures to convert ore into raw metals, while hydrometallurgy employs aqueous chemistry for the same purpose.

When a metallic ore is an ionic compound, the ore must usually be smelted—heated with a reducing agent—to extract the pure metal. Many common metals, such as iron, are smelted using carbon as a reducing agent. Some metals, such as aluminium and sodium, have no commercially practical reducing agent, and are extracted using electrolysis instead.

Sulfide ores are not reduced directly to the metal but are roasted in air to convert them to oxides.

=== Recycling ===
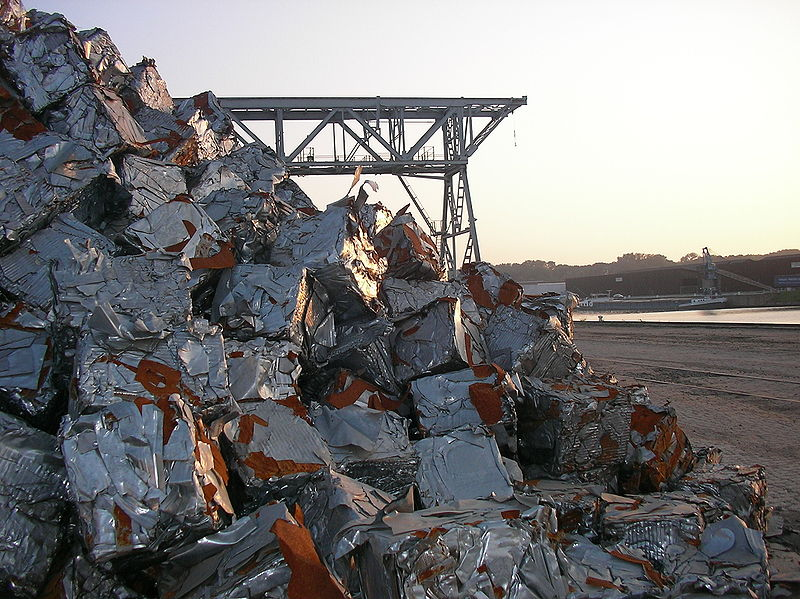
A pile of compacted steel scraps, ready for recycling

Demand for metals is closely linked to economic growth given their use in infrastructure, construction, manufacturing, and consumer goods. During the 20th century, the variety of metals used in society grew rapidly. Today, the development of major nations, such as China and India, and technological advances, are fueling ever more demand. The result is that mining activities are expanding, and more and more of the world's metal stocks are above ground in use, rather than below ground as unused reserves. An example is the in-use stock of copper. Between 1932 and 1999, copper in use in the U.S. rose from 73 kg to 238 kg per person.

Metals are inherently recyclable, so in principle, can be used over and over again, minimizing these negative environmental impacts and saving energy. For example, 95% of the energy used to make aluminium from bauxite ore is saved by using recycled material. However, globally metal recycling is generally low. In 2010, the International Resource Panel, hosted by the United Nations Environment Programme published reports on metal stocks that exist within society and their recycling rates.

The authors of the report observed that the metal stocks in society can serve as huge mines above ground. They warned that the recycling rates of some rare metals used in applications such as mobile phones, battery packs for hybrid cars and fuel cells are so low that unless future end-of-life recycling rates are dramatically stepped up these critical metals will become unavailable for use in modern technology.

== History ==
=== Prehistory ===
Copper, which occurs in native form, may have been the first metal discovered given its distinctive appearance, heaviness, and malleability. Gold, silver, iron (as meteoric iron), and lead were likewise discovered in prehistory. Forms of brass, an alloy of copper and zinc made by concurrently smelting the ores of these metals, originate from this period (although pure zinc was not isolated until the 13th century). The malleability of the solid metals led to the first attempts to craft metal ornaments, tools, and weapons. Meteoric iron containing nickel was discovered from time to time and, in some respects, this was superior to any industrial steel manufactured up to the 1880s when alloy steels became prominent.

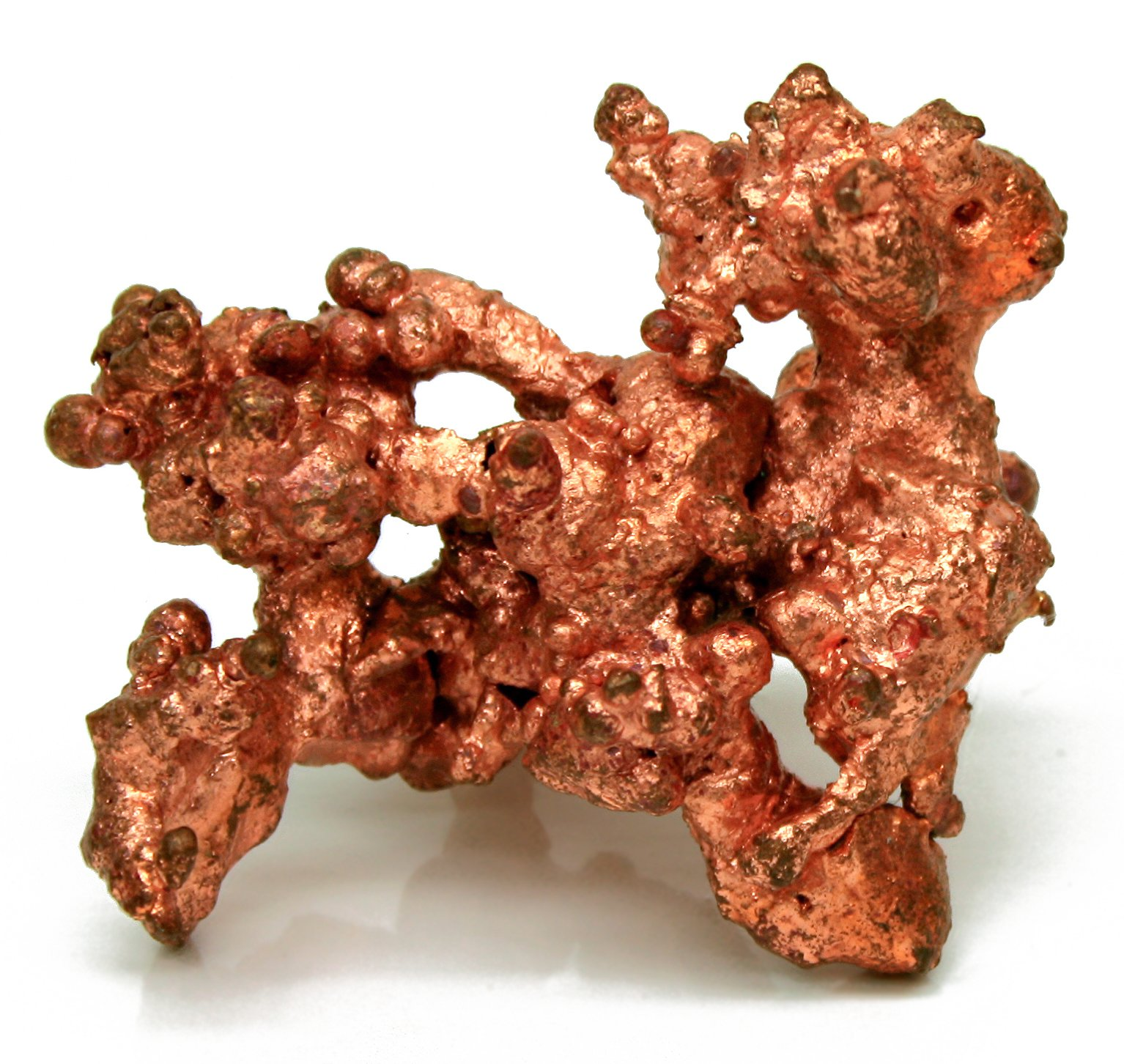
Native copper

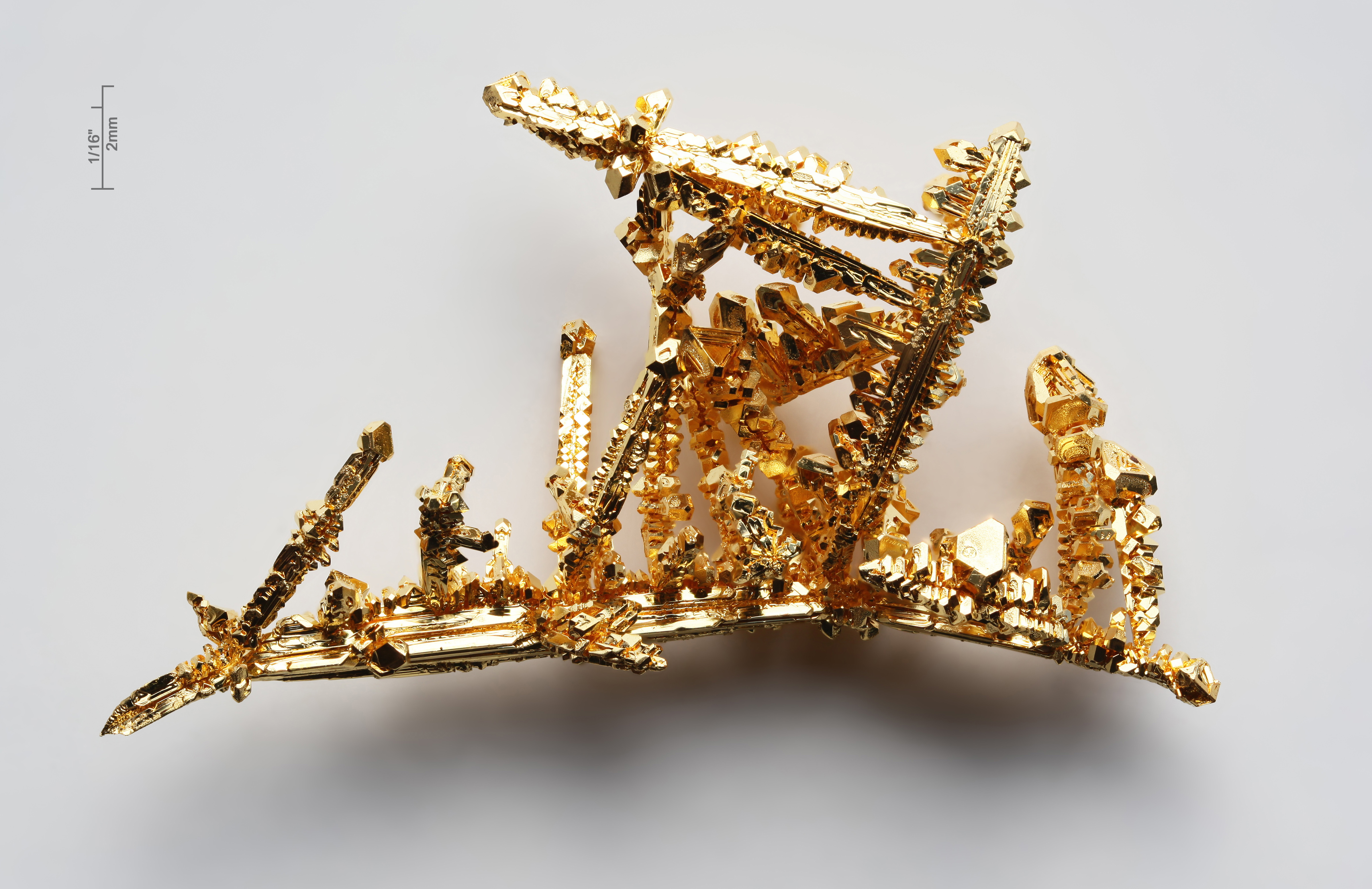
Gold crystals

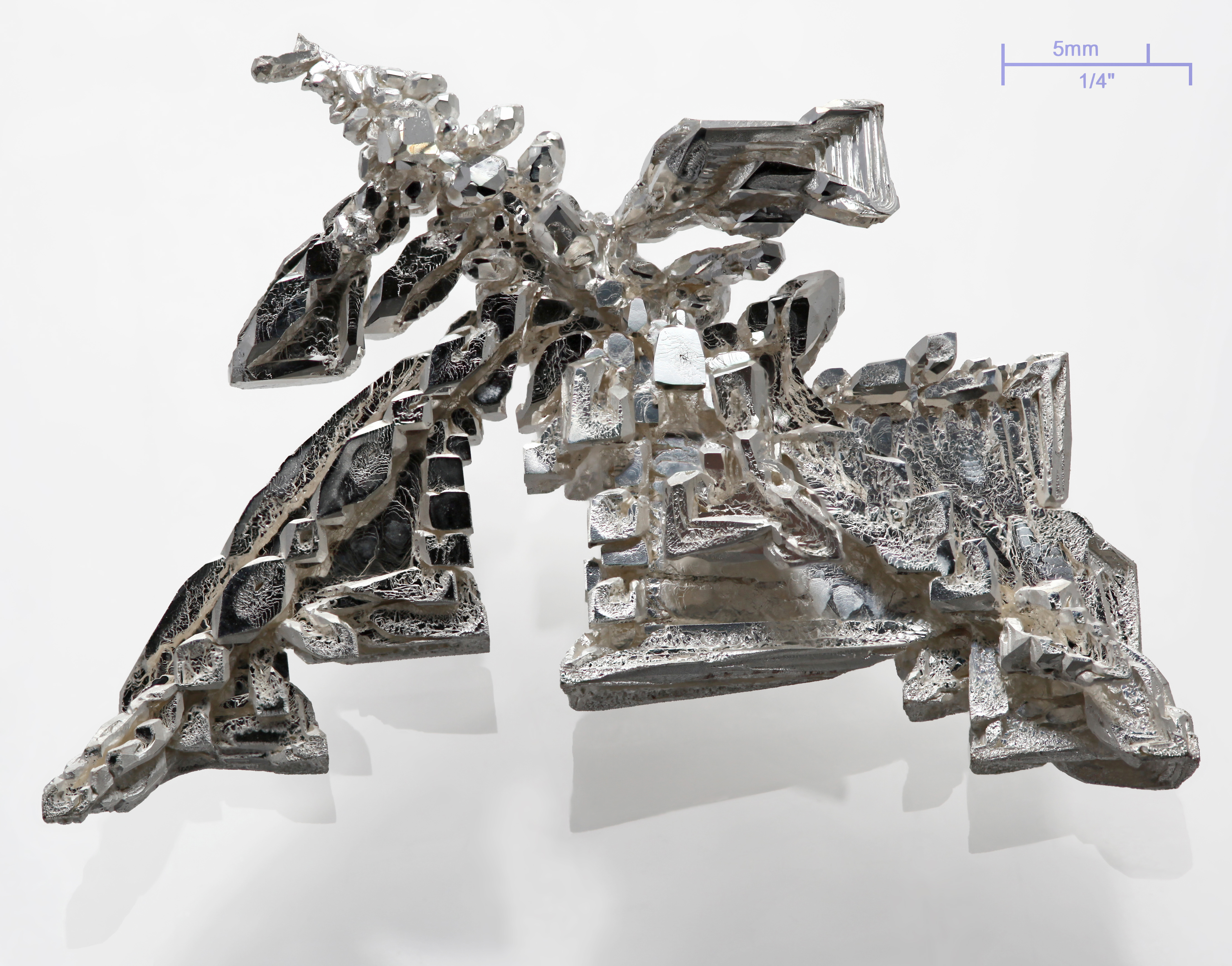
Crystalline silver

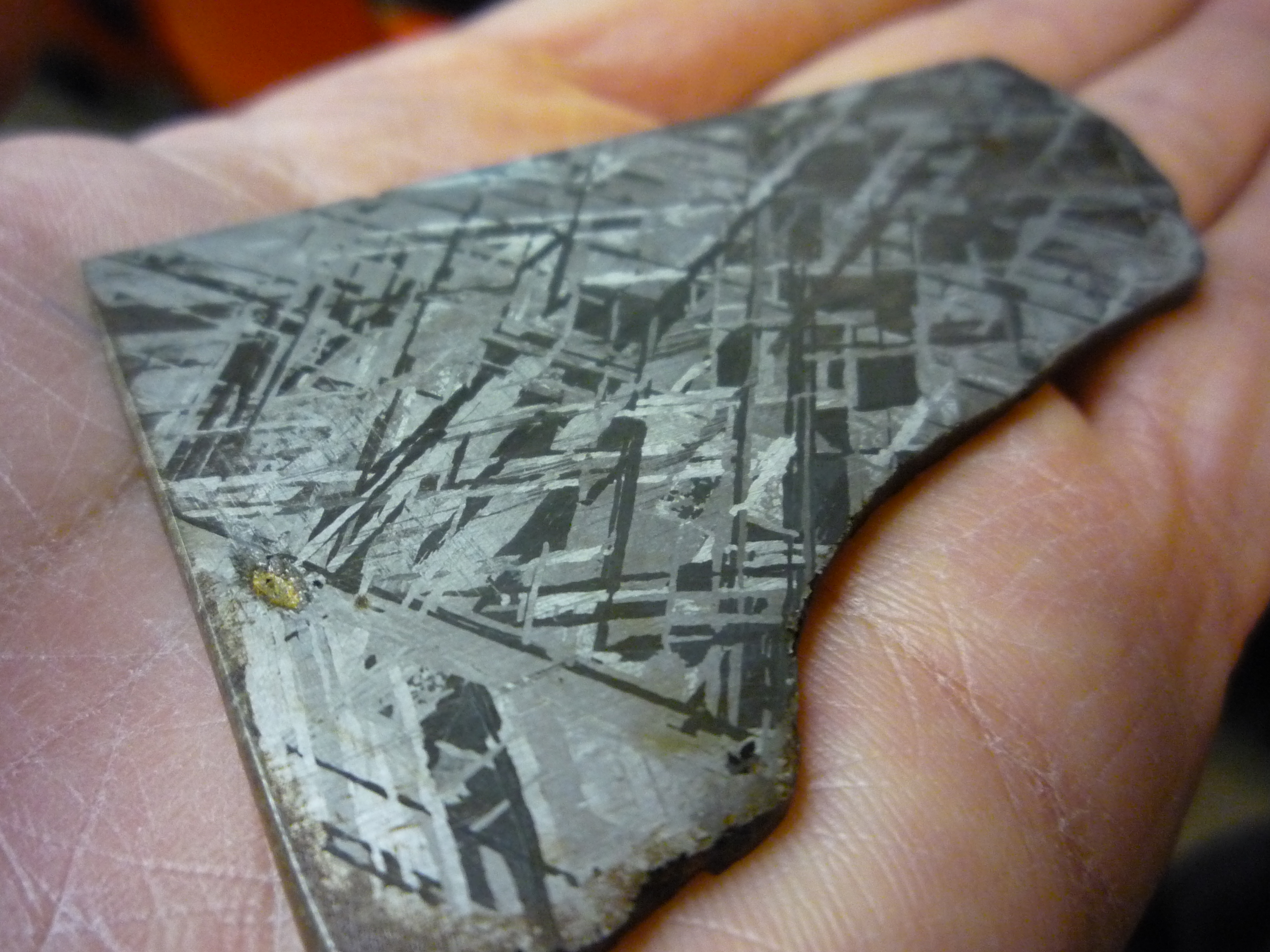
A slice of meteoric iron

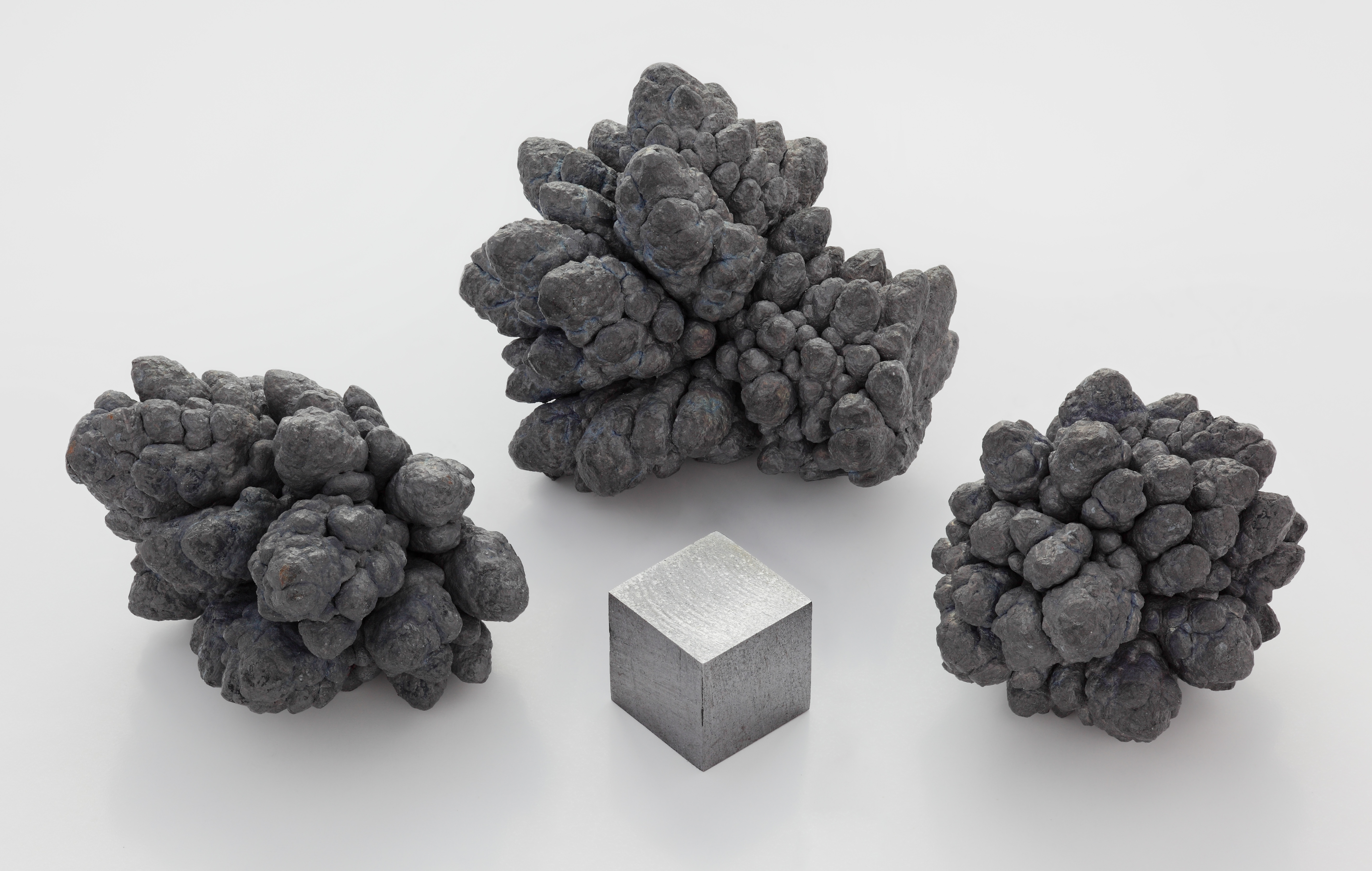
oxidised lead
nodules and 1 cm^{3} cube

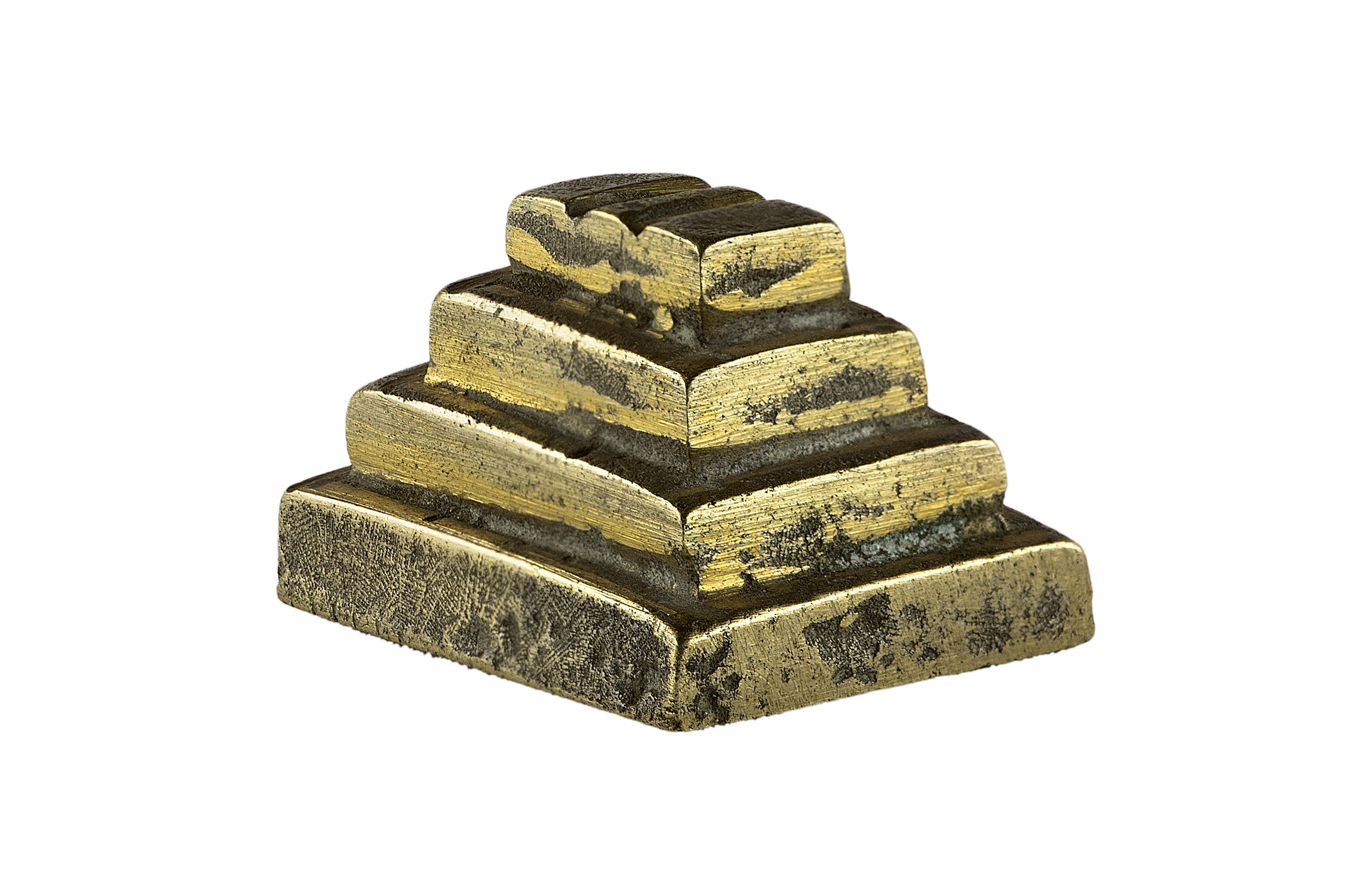
A brass weight (35 g)

=== Antiquity ===
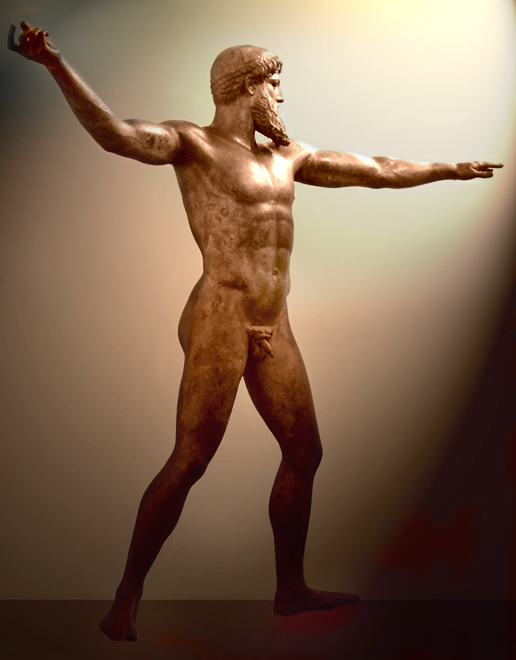
The Artemision Bronze (Note: Bronze is an alloy consisting primarily of copper, commonly with about 12% tin and often with the addition of other metals (such as aluminium, manganese, nickel, or zinc) and sometimes non-metals or metalloids such as arsenic, phosphorus, or silicon.) showing either Poseidon or Zeus, c. 460 BCE, National Archaeological Museum, Athens. The figure is more than 2 m in height.

The discovery of bronze (an alloy of copper with arsenic or tin) enabled people to create metal objects which were harder and more durable than previously possible. Bronze tools, weapons, armor, and building materials such as decorative tiles were harder and more durable than their stone and copper ("Chalcolithic") predecessors. Initially, bronze was made of copper and arsenic (forming arsenic bronze) by smelting naturally or artificially mixed ores of copper and arsenic. The earliest artifacts so far known come from the Iranian plateau in the fifth millennium BCE. It was only later that tin was used, becoming the major non-copper ingredient of bronze in the late third millennium BCE.

Mercury was known to ancient Chinese and Indians before 2000 BCE, and found in Egyptian tombs dating from 1500 BCE.

The earliest known production of steel, an iron-carbon alloy, is seen in pieces of ironware excavated from an archaeological site in Anatolia (Kaman-Kalehöyük) which are nearly 4,000 years old, dating from 1800 BCE.

From about 500 BCE sword-makers of Toledo, Spain, were making early forms of alloy steel by adding a mineral called wolframite, which contained tungsten and manganese, to iron ore (and carbon). The resulting Toledo steel came to the attention of Rome when used by Hannibal in the Punic Wars. It soon became the basis for the weaponry of Roman legions; such swords were "stronger in composition than any existing sword and, because… [they] would not break, provided a psychological advantage to the Roman soldier."

In pre-Columbian America, objects made of tumbaga, an alloy of copper and gold, started being produced in Panama and Costa Rica between 300 and 500 CE. Small metal sculptures were common and an extensive range of tumbaga (and gold) ornaments comprised the usual regalia of persons of high status.

At around the same time indigenous Ecuadorians were combining gold with a naturally occurring platinum alloy containing small amounts of palladium, rhodium, and iridium, to produce miniatures and masks of a white gold-platinum alloy. The metal workers involved heated gold with grains of the platinum alloy until the gold melted. After cooling, the resulting conglomeration was hammered and reheated repeatedly until it became homogenous, equivalent to melting all the metals (attaining the melting points of the platinum group metals concerned was beyond the technology of the day). (Note: In Damascus, Syria, blade-smiths forged knives and swords with a distinctive surface pattern composed of swirling patterns of light-etched regions on a nearly black background. These blades had legendary cutting abilities. The iron the smiths were using was sourced from India, and contained one or more carbide-forming elements, such as V, Mo, Cr, Mn, and Nb. Modern analysis of these weapons has shown that these elements supported the catalytic formation of carbon nanotubes, which in turn promoted the formation of cementite (Fe3C) nanowires. The malleability of the carbon nanotubes offset the brittle nature of the cementite, and endowed the resulting steel with a unique combination of strength and flexibility. Knowledge of how to make what came to be called Damascus steel died out in the eighteenth century possibly due to exhausting ore sources with the right combination of impurities. The techniques involved were not rediscovered until 2009.)

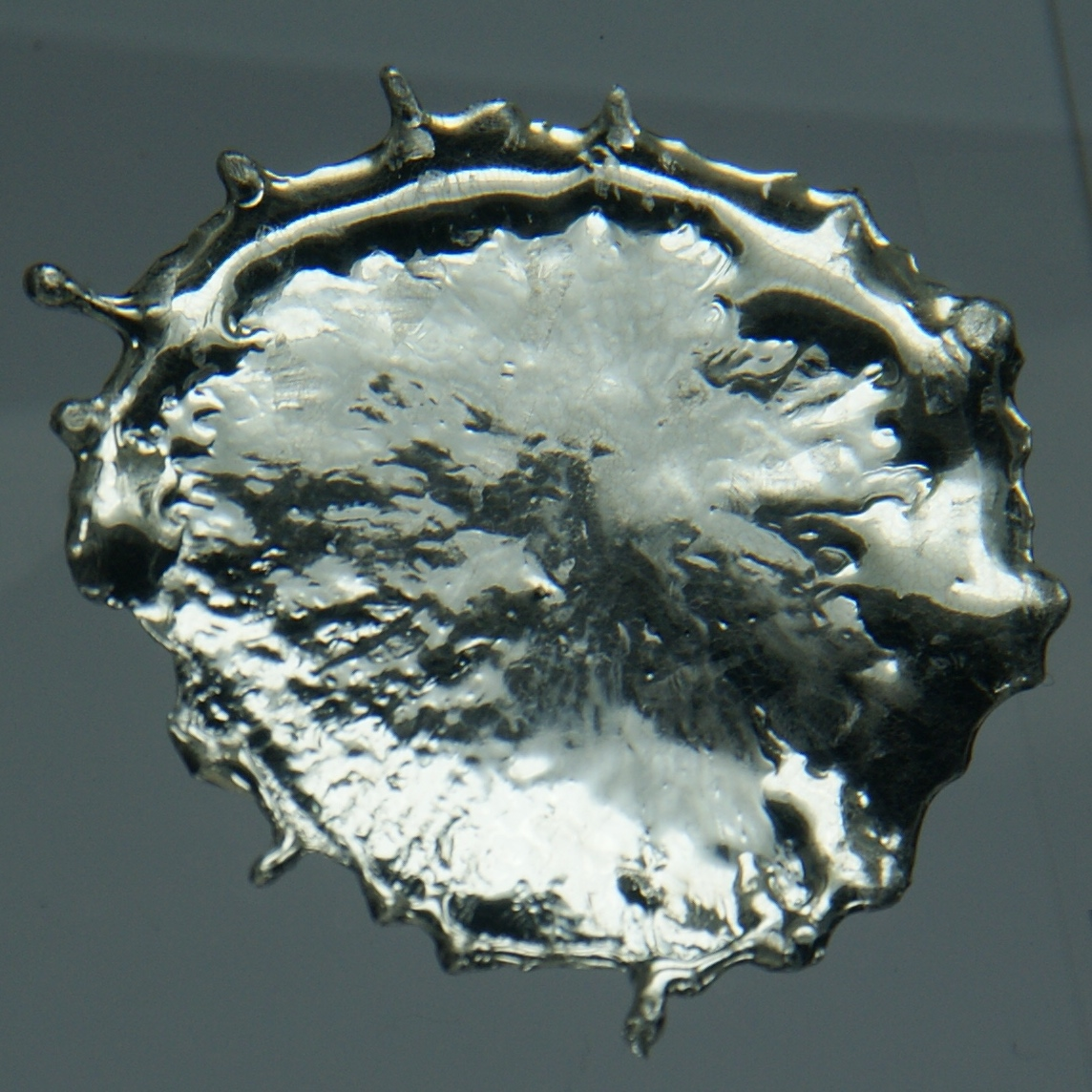
A droplet of solidified molten tin

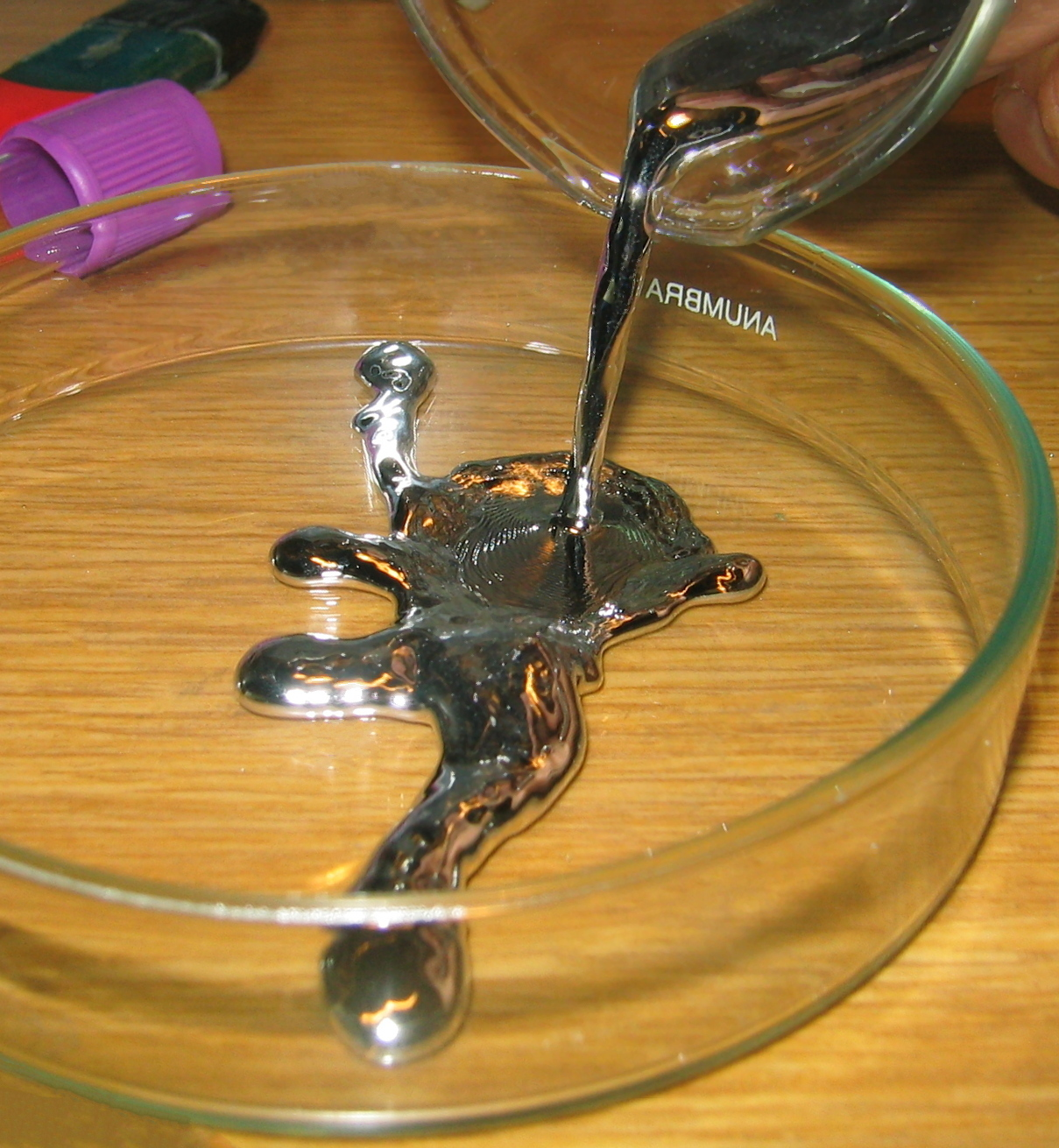
Mercury being
poured into a petri dish

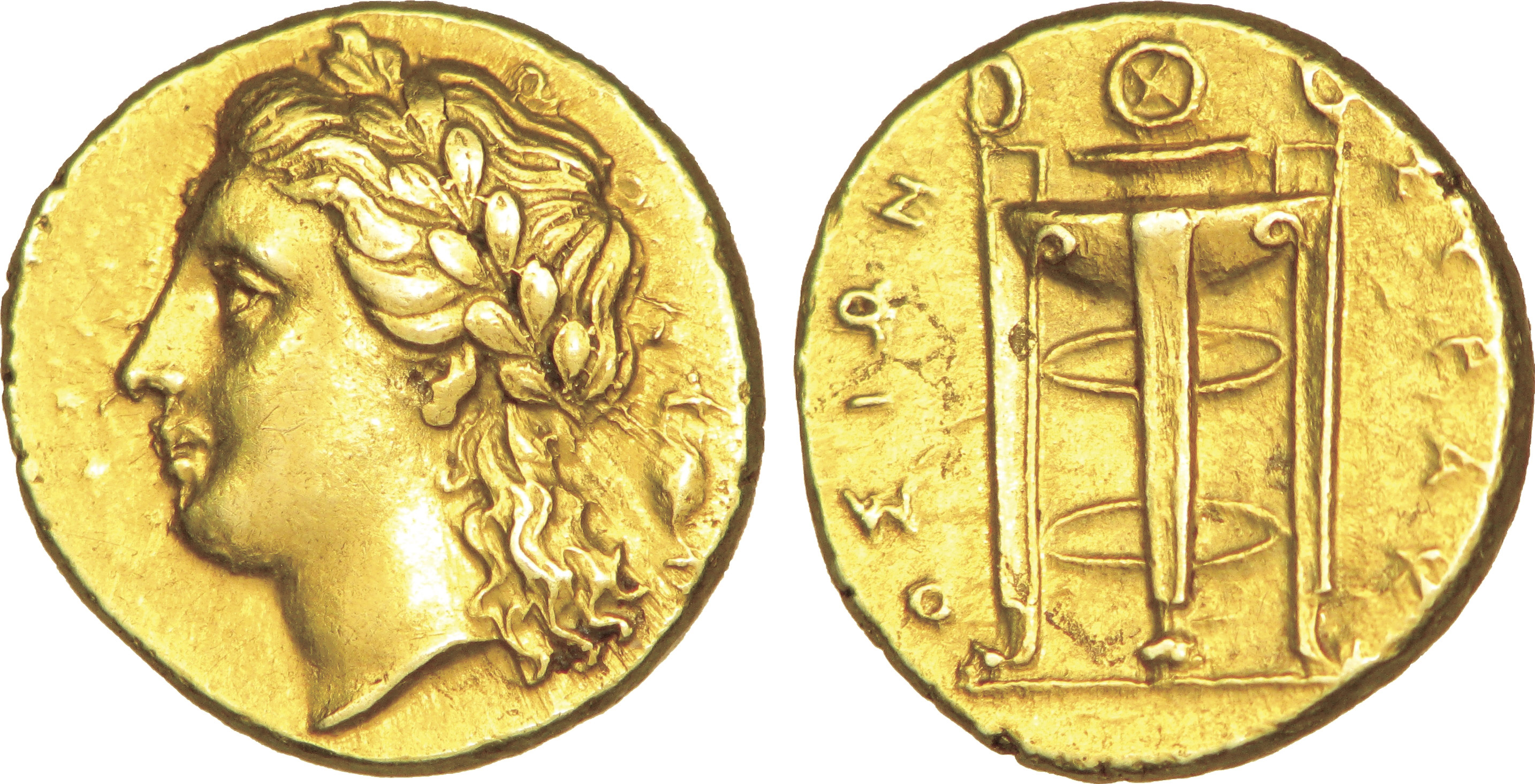
Electrum, a natural alloy of silver and gold, was often used for making coins. Shown is the Greek god Apollo, and on the obverse, a Delphi tripod (c. 310–305 BCE).

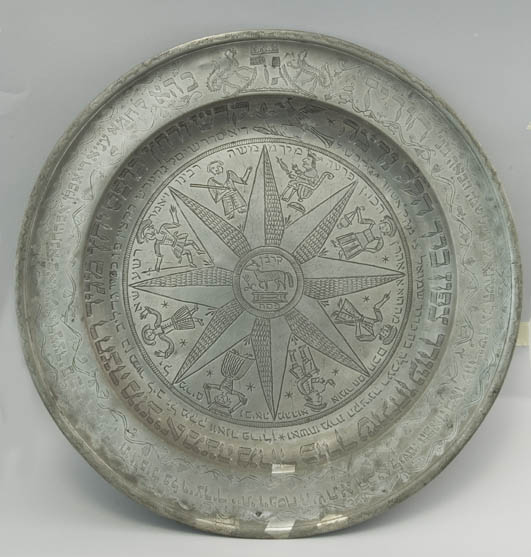
A plate made of pewter, an alloy of 85–99% tin and (usually) copper. Pewter was first used around the beginning of the Bronze Age in the Near East.

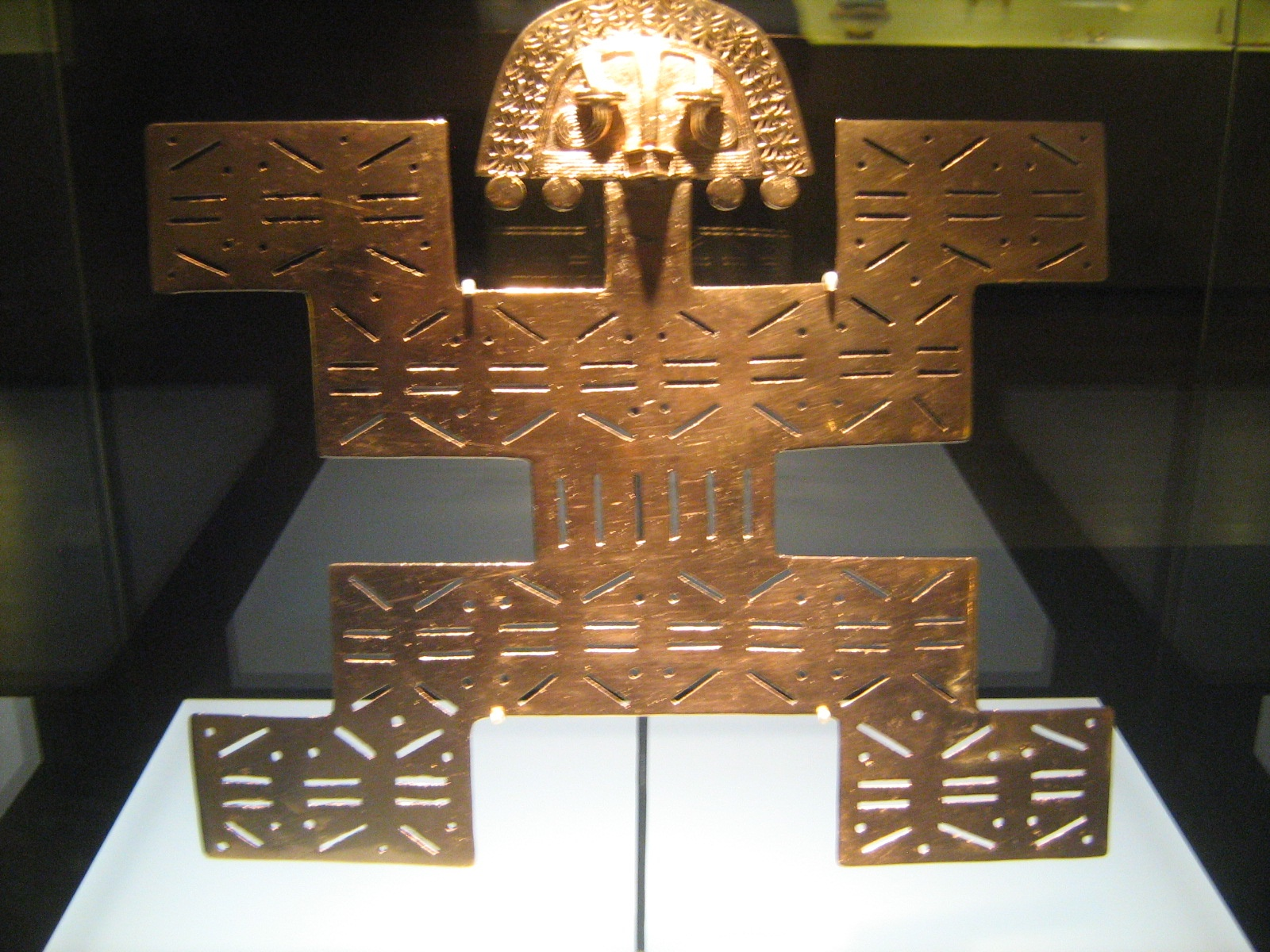
A pectoral (ornamental breastplate) made of tumbaga, an alloy of gold and copper

==== Ancient Greece ====
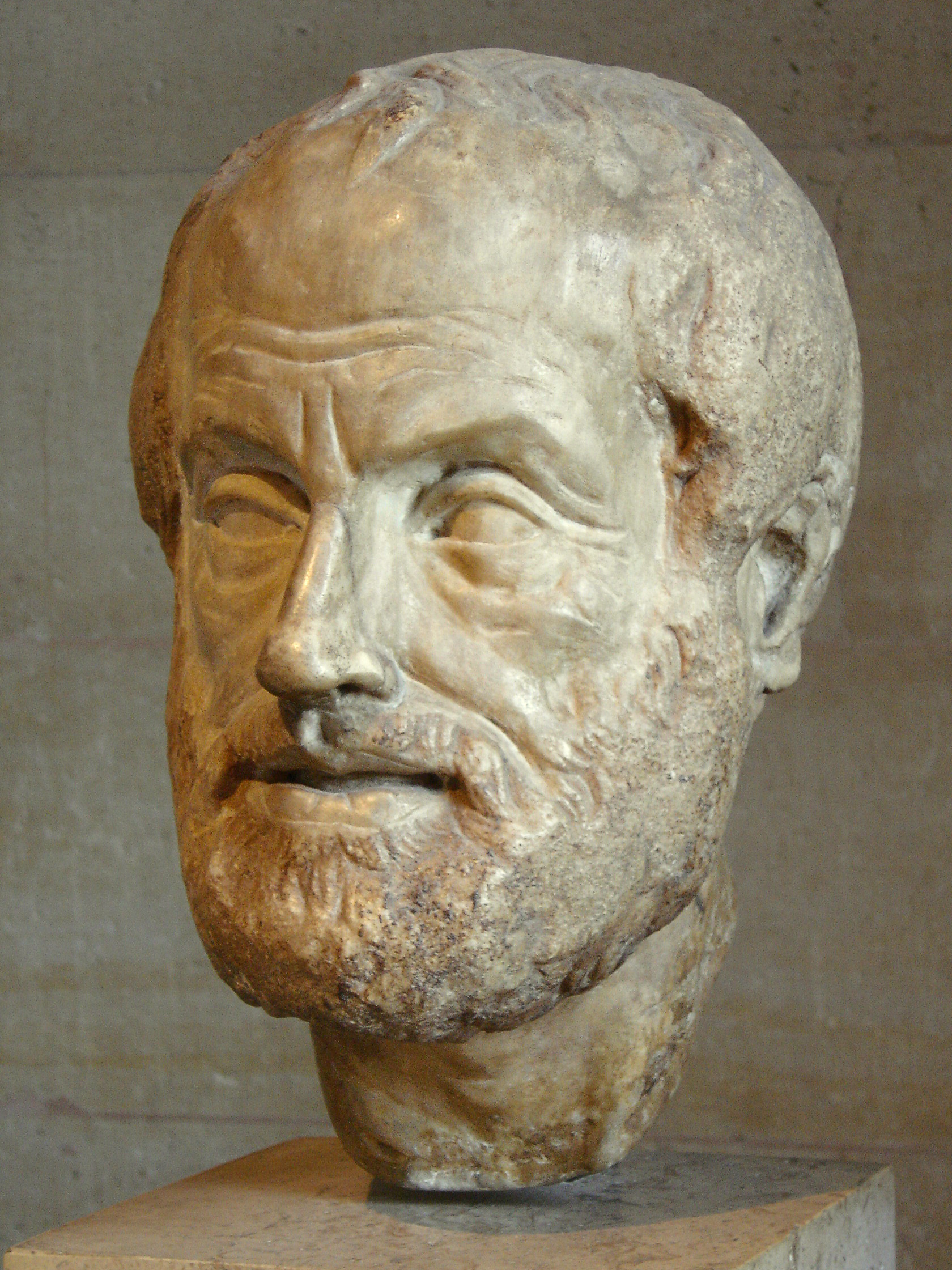
Greek philosopher Aristotle (384–322 BCE) categorized substances found in the earth as either metals or minerals.

Around 340 BCE, in Book III of his treatise Meteorology, the ancient Greek philosopher Aristotle categorized substances found within the Earth into metals and minerals. The latter category included various minerals such as realgar, ochre, ruddle, sulfur, cinnabar, and other substances that he referred to as "stones which cannot be melted".

=== Middle Ages ===
Gold is for the mistress—silver for the maid—
Copper for the craftsman cunning at his trade.
"Good!" said the Baron, sitting in his hall,
"But Iron—Cold Iron—is master of them all."

— from Cold Iron by Rudyard Kipling

Arabic and medieval alchemists believed that all metals and matter were composed of the principle of sulfur, the father of all metals and carrying the combustible property, and the principle of mercury, the mother of all metals (Note: In ancient times, lead was regarded as the father of all metals.) and carrier of the liquidity, fusibility, and volatility properties. These principles were not necessarily the common substances sulfur and mercury found in most laboratories. This theory reinforced the belief that all metals were destined to become gold in the bowels of the earth through the proper combinations of heat, digestion, time, and elimination of contaminants, all of which could be developed and hastened through the knowledge and methods of alchemy. (Note: Paracelsus, a later German Renaissance writer, added the third principle of salt, carrying the nonvolatile and incombustible properties, in his tria prima doctrine. These theories retained the four classical elements as underlying the composition of sulfur, mercury, and salt.)

Arsenic, zinc, antimony, and bismuth became known, although these were at first called semimetals or bastard metals on account of their immalleability. Albertus Magnus is believed to have been the first to isolate arsenic from a compound in 1250, by heating soap together with arsenic trisulfide. Metallic zinc, which is brittle if impure, was isolated in India by 1300 AD. The first description of a procedure for isolating antimony is in the 1540 book De la pirotechnia by Vannoccio Biringuccio. Bismuth was described by Agricola in De Natura Fossilium (c. 1546); it had been confused in early times with tin and lead because of its resemblance to those elements.

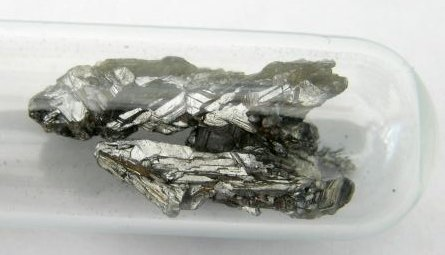
Arsenic, sealed in a container to prevent tarnishing

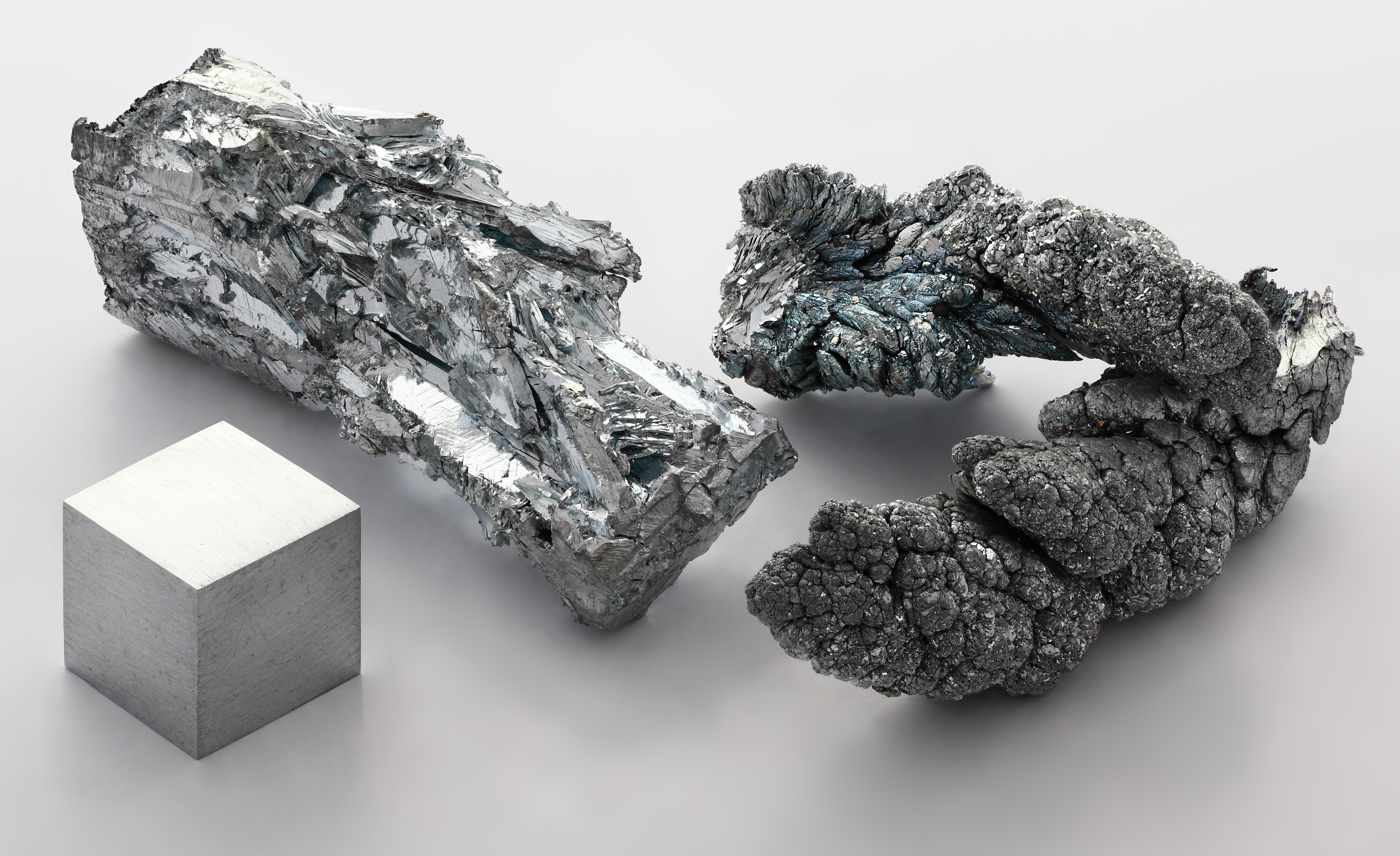
Zinc fragments and a 1 cm^{3} cube

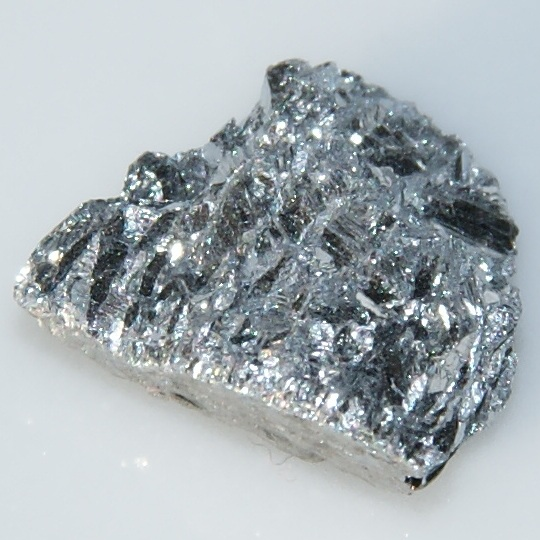
Antimony, showing its brilliant lustre

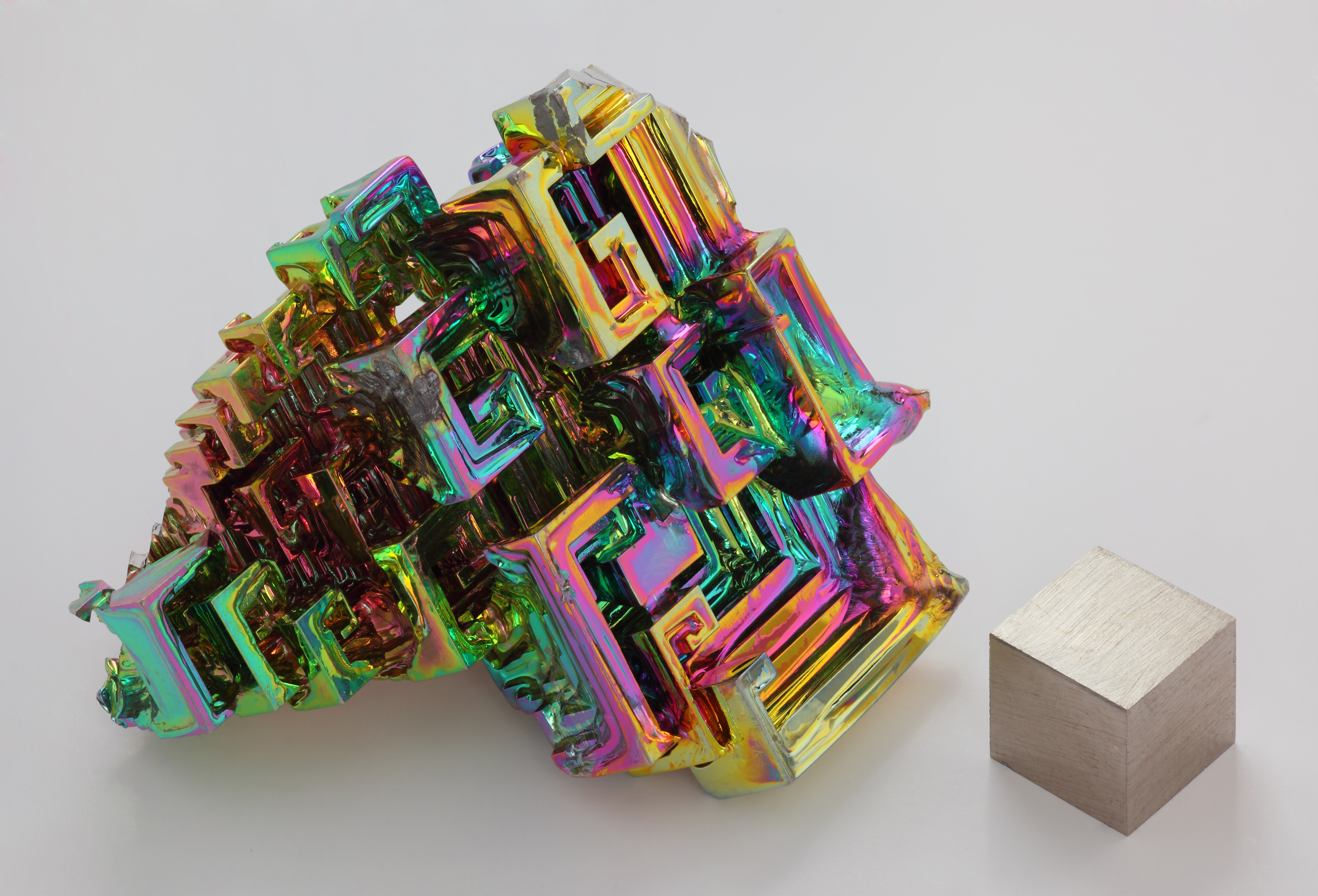
Bismuth in crystalline form, with a very thin oxidation layer, and a 1 cm^{3} bismuth cube

=== The Renaissance ===
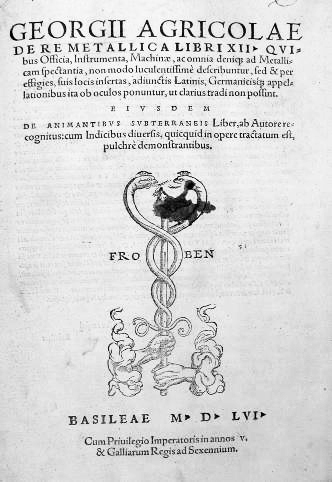
De re metallica, 1555

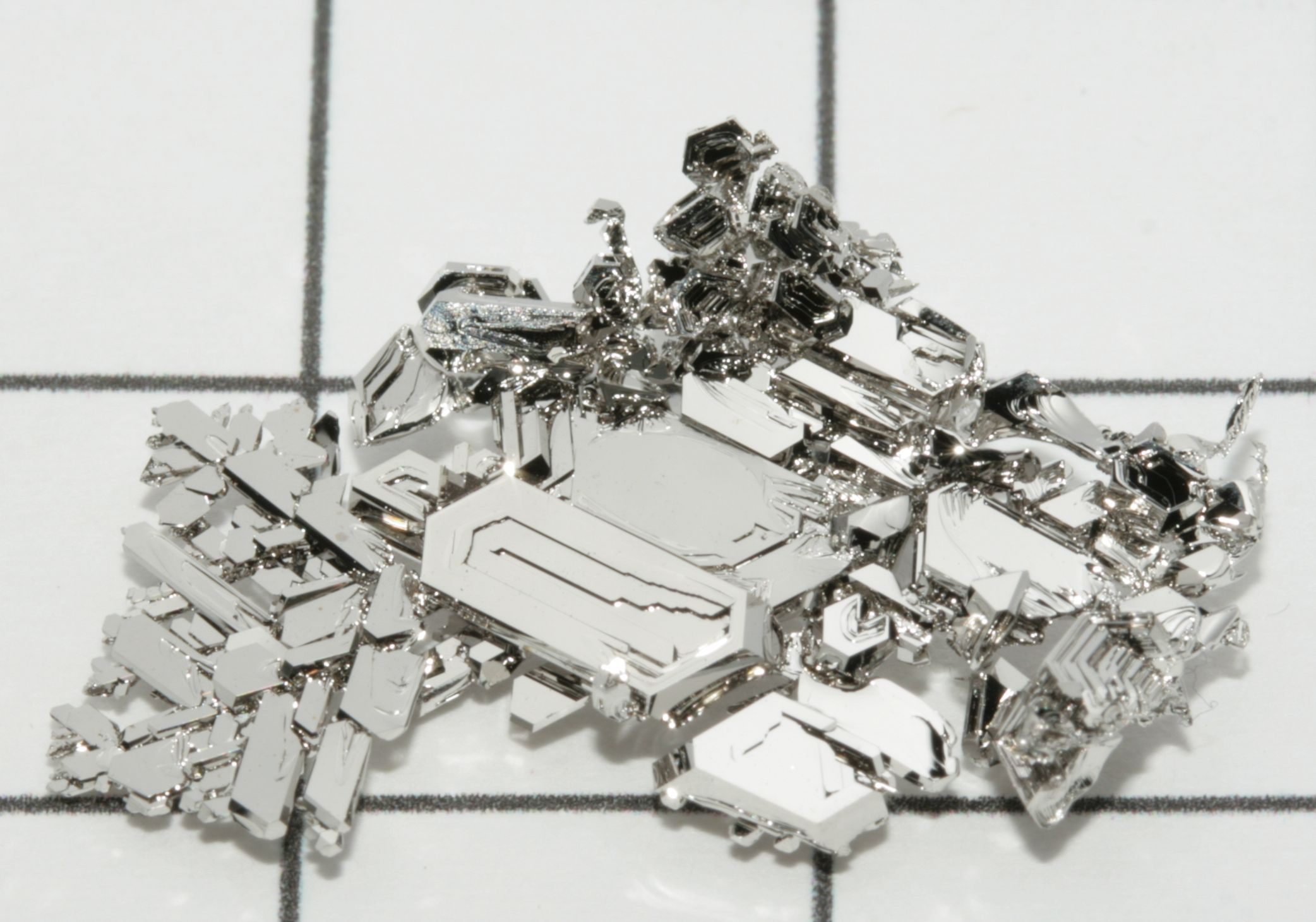
Platinum crystals

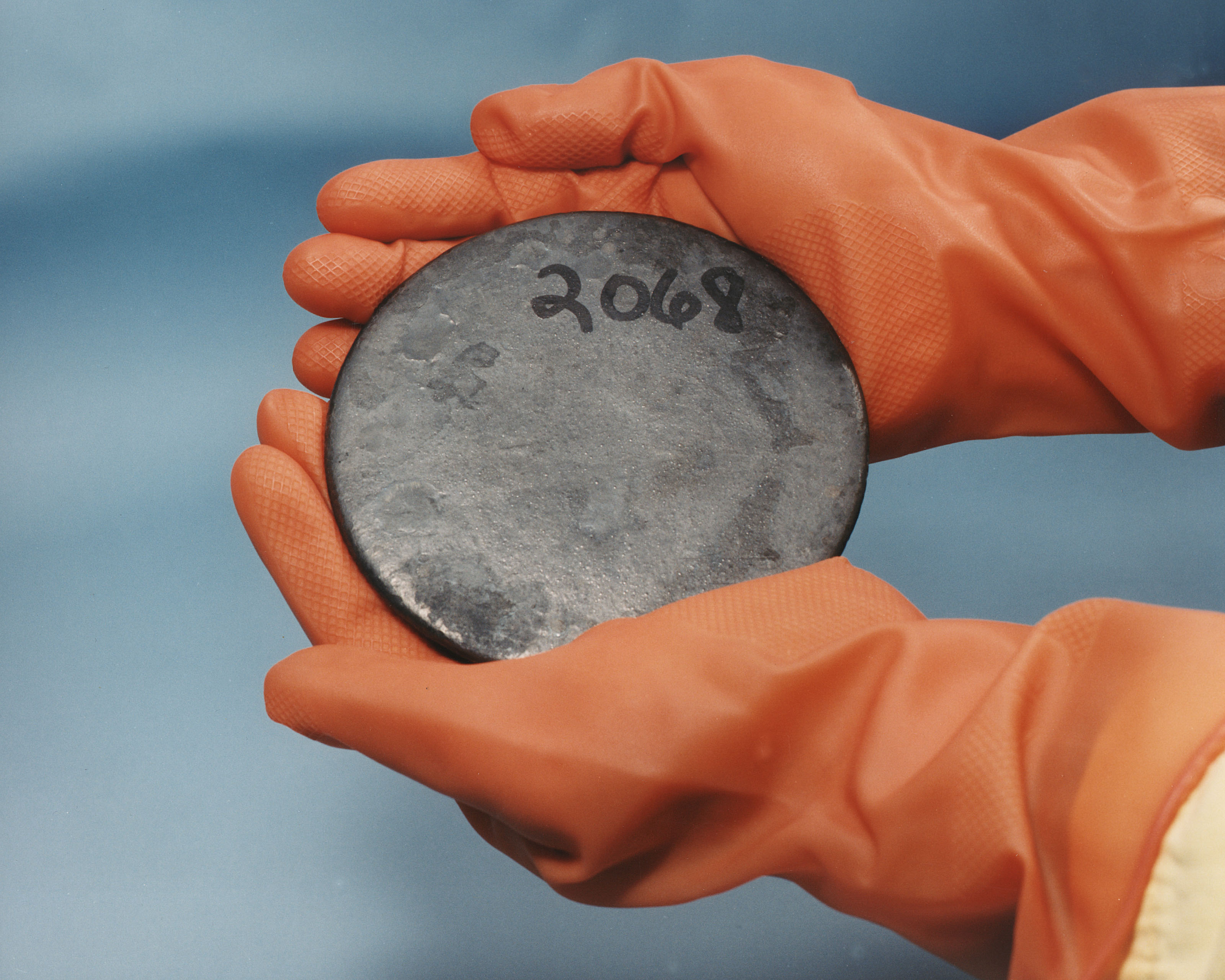
A disc of highly enriched uranium that was recovered from scrap processed at the Y-12 National Security Complex, in Oak Ridge, Tennessee

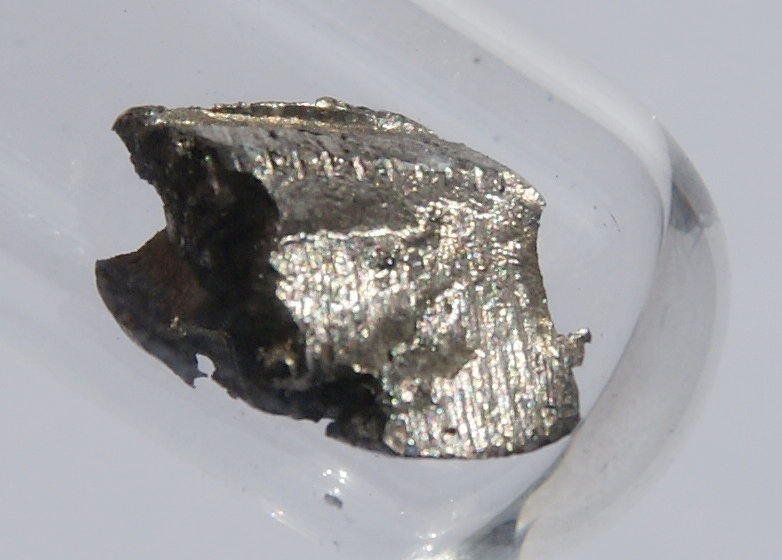
Ultrapure cerium under argon, 1.5 g

The first systematic text on the arts of mining and metallurgy was De la Pirotechnia (1540) by Vannoccio Biringuccio, which treats the examination, fusion, and working of metals.

Sixteen years later, Georgius Agricola published De Re Metallica in 1556, an account of the profession of mining, metallurgy, and the accessory arts and sciences, an extensive treatise on the chemical industry through the sixteenth century.

He gave the following description of a metal in his De Natura Fossilium (1546):

Metal is a mineral body, by nature either liquid or somewhat hard. The latter may be melted by the heat of the fire, but when it has cooled down again and lost all heat, it becomes hard again and resumes its proper form. In this respect it differs from the stone which melts in the fire, for although the latter regain its hardness, yet it loses its pristine form and properties.

Traditionally there are six different kinds of metals, namely gold, silver, copper, iron, tin, and lead. There are really others, for quicksilver is a metal, although the Alchemists disagree with us on this subject, and bismuth is also. The ancient Greek writers seem to have been ignorant of bismuth, wherefore Ammonius rightly states that there are many species of metals, animals, and plants which are unknown to us. Stibium when smelted in the crucible and refined has as much right to be regarded as a proper metal as is accorded to lead by writers. If when smelted, a certain portion be added to tin, a bookseller's alloy is produced from which the type is made that is used by those who print books on paper.

Each metal has its own form which it preserves when separated from those metals which were mixed with it. Therefore neither electrum nor Stannum [not meaning our tin] is of itself a real metal, but rather an alloy of two metals. Electrum is an alloy of gold and silver, Stannum of lead and silver. And yet if silver be parted from the electrum, then gold remains and not electrum; if silver be taken away from Stannum, then lead remains and not Stannum.

Whether brass, however, is found as a native metal or not, cannot be ascertained with any surety. We only know of the artificial brass, which consists of copper tinted with the colour of the mineral calamine. And yet if any should be dug up, it would be a proper metal. Black and white copper seem to be different from the red kind.

Metal, therefore, is by nature either solid, as I have stated, or fluid, as in the unique case of quicksilver.

But enough now concerning the simple kinds.

Platinum, the third precious metal after gold and silver, was discovered in Ecuador during the period 1736 to 1744 by the Spanish astronomer Antonio de Ulloa and his colleague the mathematician Jorge Juan y Santacilia. Ulloa was the first person to write a scientific description of the metal, in 1748.

In 1789, the German chemist Martin Heinrich Klaproth isolated an oxide of uranium, which he thought was the metal itself. Klaproth was subsequently credited as the discoverer of uranium. It was not until 1841 that the French chemist Eugène-Melchior Péligot prepared the first sample of uranium metal. Henri Becquerel subsequently discovered radioactivity in 1896 using uranium.

In the 1790s, Joseph Priestley and the Dutch chemist Martinus van Marum observed the effect of metal surfaces on the dehydrogenation of alcohol, a development which subsequently led, in 1831, to the industrial scale synthesis of sulphuric acid using a platinum catalyst.

In 1803, cerium was the first of the lanthanide metals to be discovered, in Bastnäs, Sweden by Jöns Jakob Berzelius and Wilhelm Hisinger, and independently by Martin Heinrich Klaproth in Germany. The lanthanide metals were regarded as oddities until the 1960s when methods were developed to more efficiently separate them from one another. They have subsequently found uses in cell phones, magnets, lasers, lighting, batteries, catalytic converters, and in other applications enabling modern technologies.

Other metals discovered and prepared during this time were cobalt, nickel, manganese, molybdenum, tungsten, and chromium; and some of the platinum group metals, palladium, osmium, iridium, and rhodium.

=== Light metallic elements ===
All elemental metals discovered before 1809 had relatively high densities; their heaviness was regarded as a distinguishing criterion. From 1809 onward, light metals such as sodium, potassium, and strontium were isolated. Their low densities challenged conventional wisdom as to the nature of metals. They behaved chemically as metals however, and were subsequently recognized as such.

Aluminium was discovered in 1824 but it was not until 1886 that an industrial large-scale production method was developed. Prices of aluminium dropped and aluminium became widely used in jewelry, everyday items, eyeglass frames, optical instruments, tableware, and foil in the 1890s and early 20th century. Aluminium's ability to form hard yet light alloys with other metals provided the metal many uses at the time. During World War I, major governments demanded large shipments of aluminium for light and strong airframes.

While pure metallic titanium (99.9%) was first prepared in 1910 it was not used outside the laboratory until 1932. In the 1950s and 1960s, the Soviet Union pioneered the use of titanium in military and submarine applications as part of programs related to the Cold War. Starting in the early 1950s, titanium came into use in military aviation, particularly in high-performance jets, starting with aircraft such as the F-100 Super Sabre and Lockheed A-12 and SR-71.

Metallic scandium was produced for the first time in 1937. The first pound of 99% pure scandium metal was produced in 1960. Production of aluminium-scandium alloys began in 1971 following a U.S. patent. Aluminium-scandium alloys were also developed in the USSR.

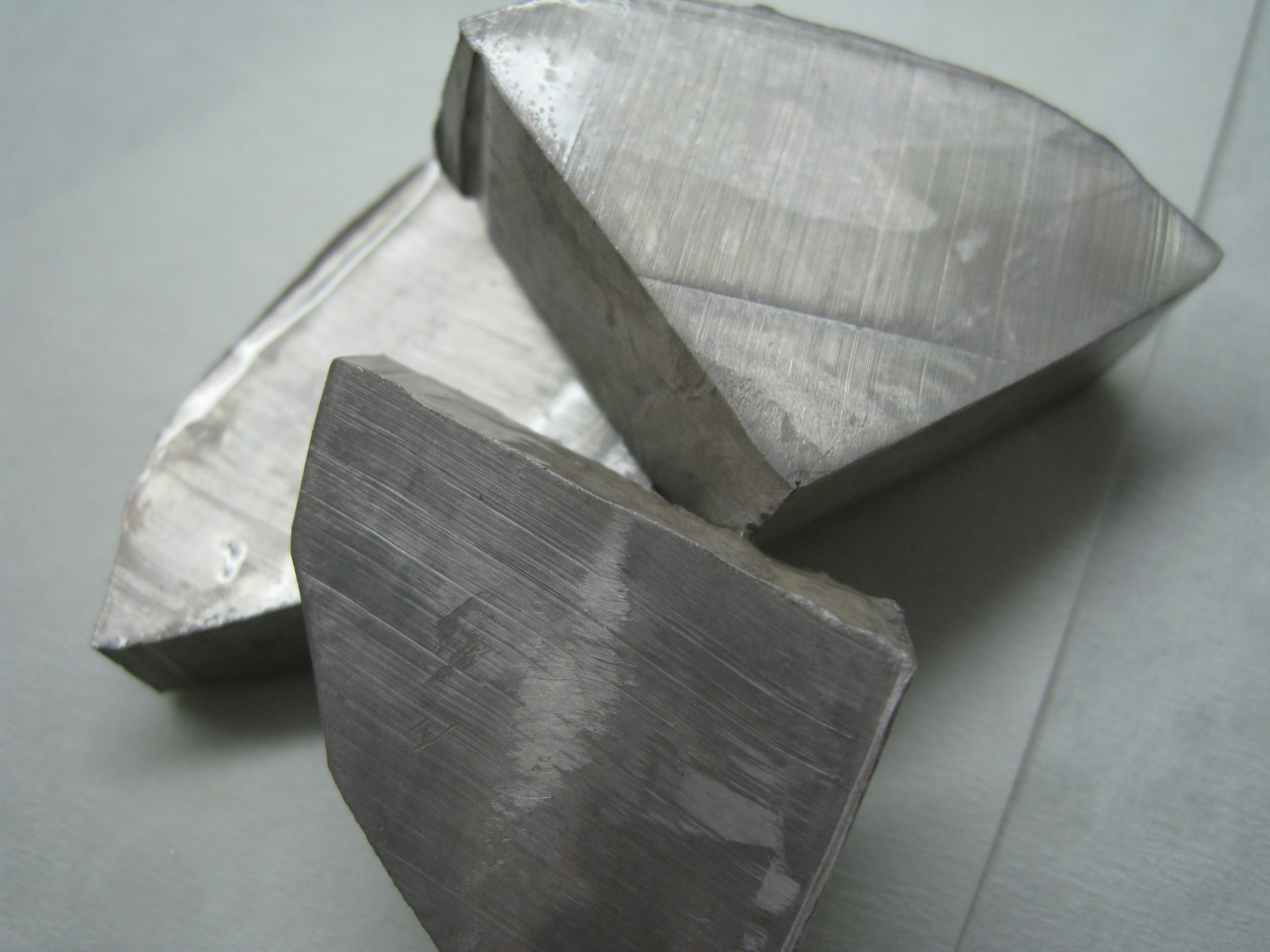
Chunks of sodium

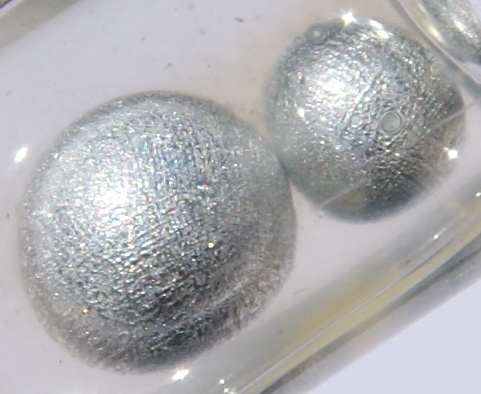
Potassium pearls under paraffin oil. Size of the largest pearl is 0.5 cm.

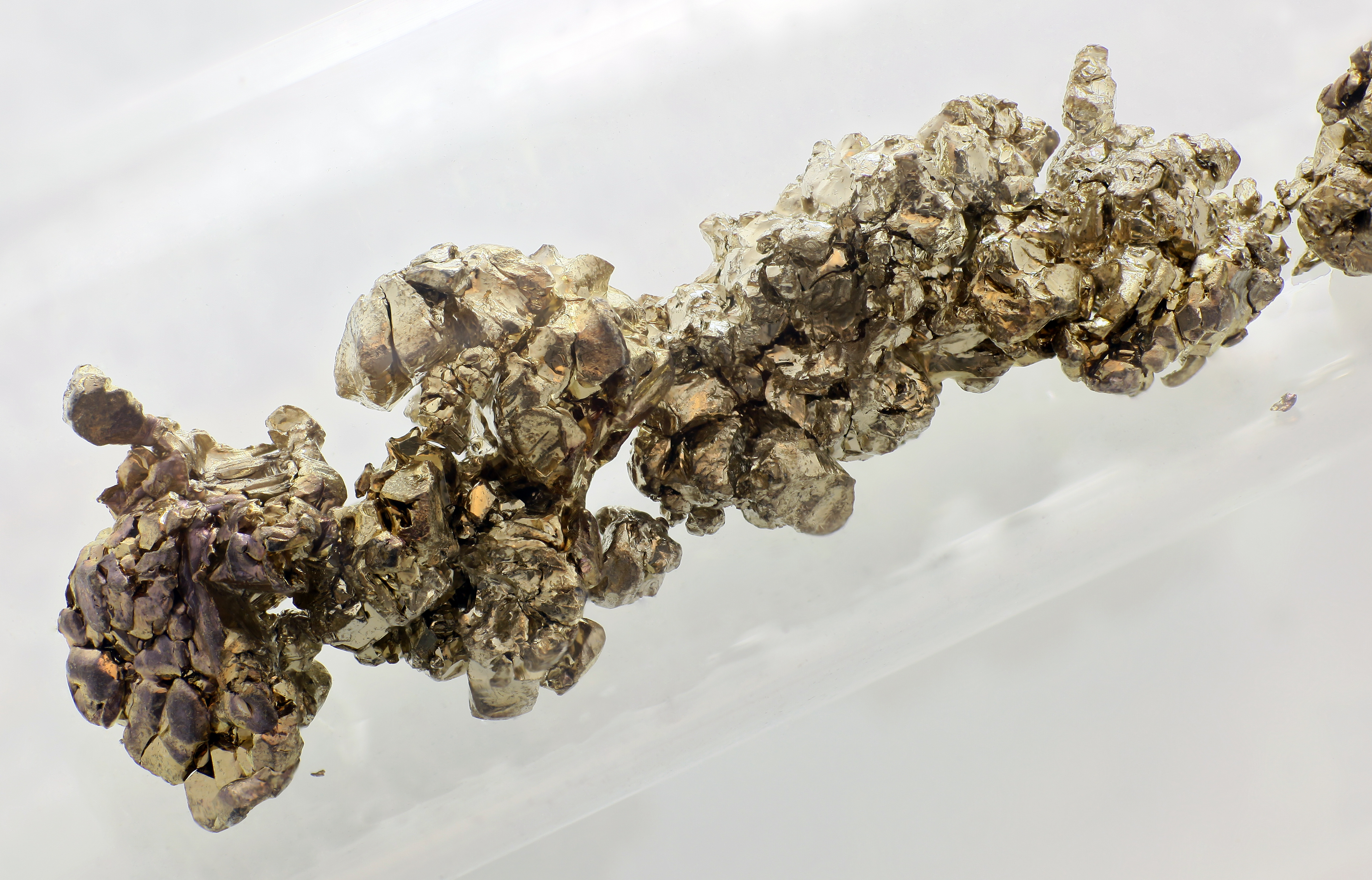
Strontium crystals

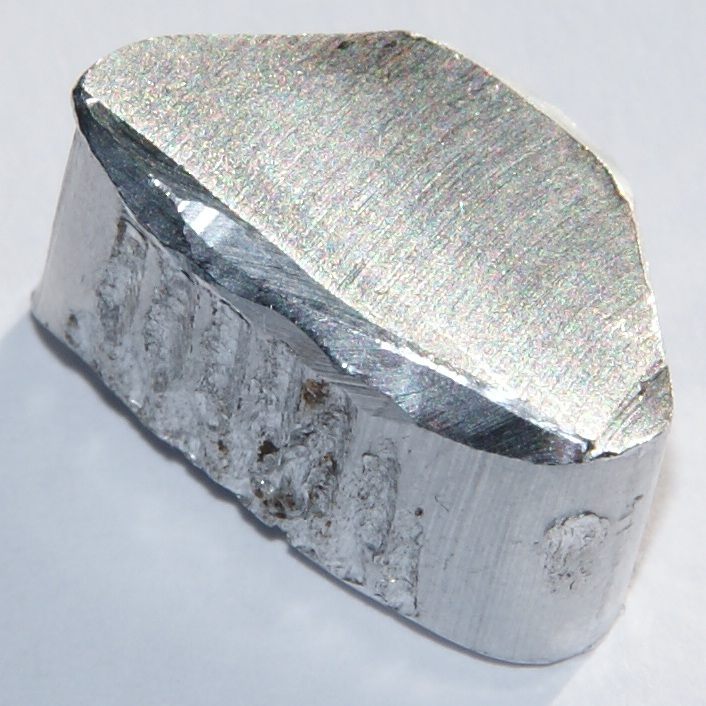
Aluminium chunk,
2.6 grams, 1 x 2 cm

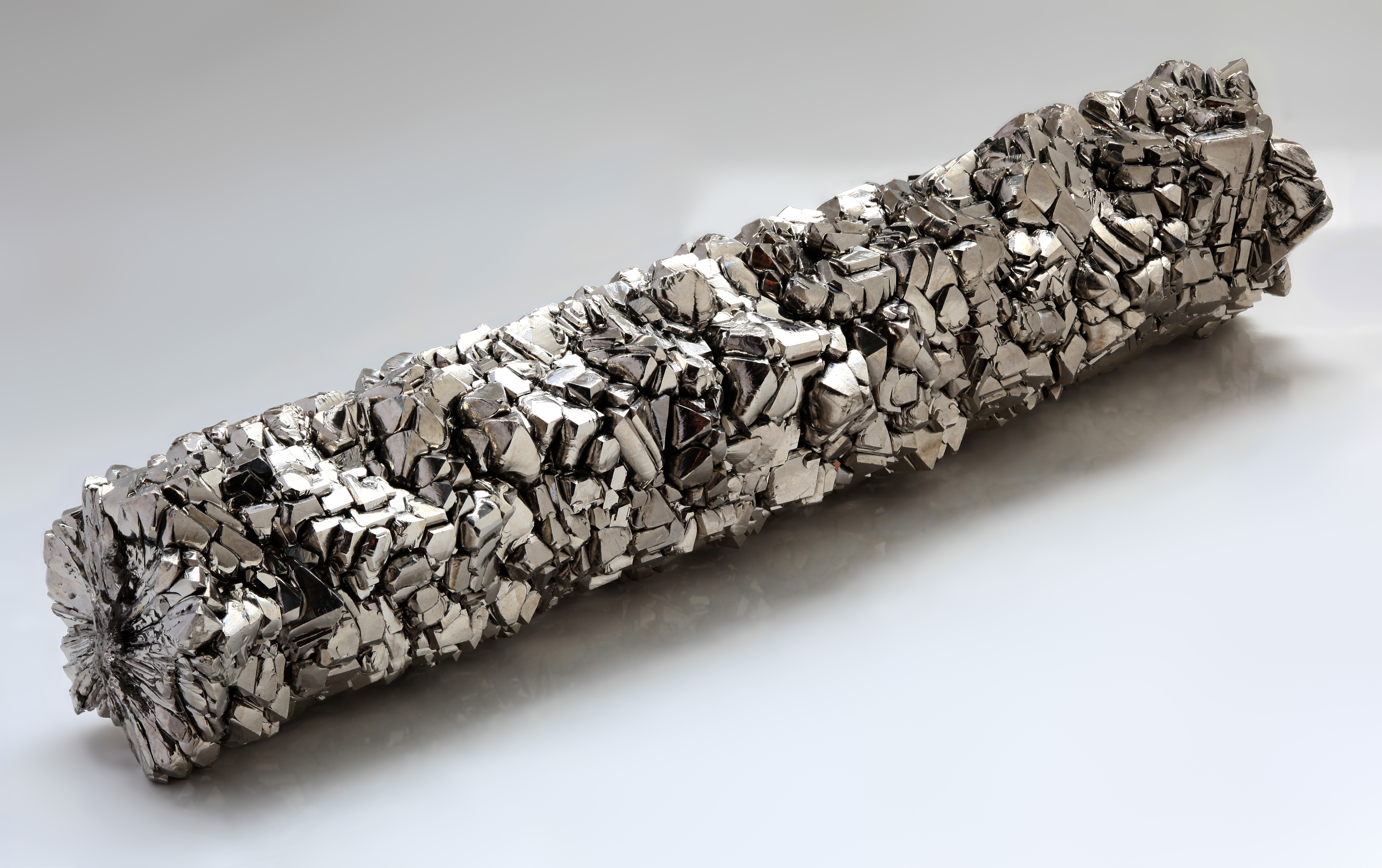
A bar of titanium crystals

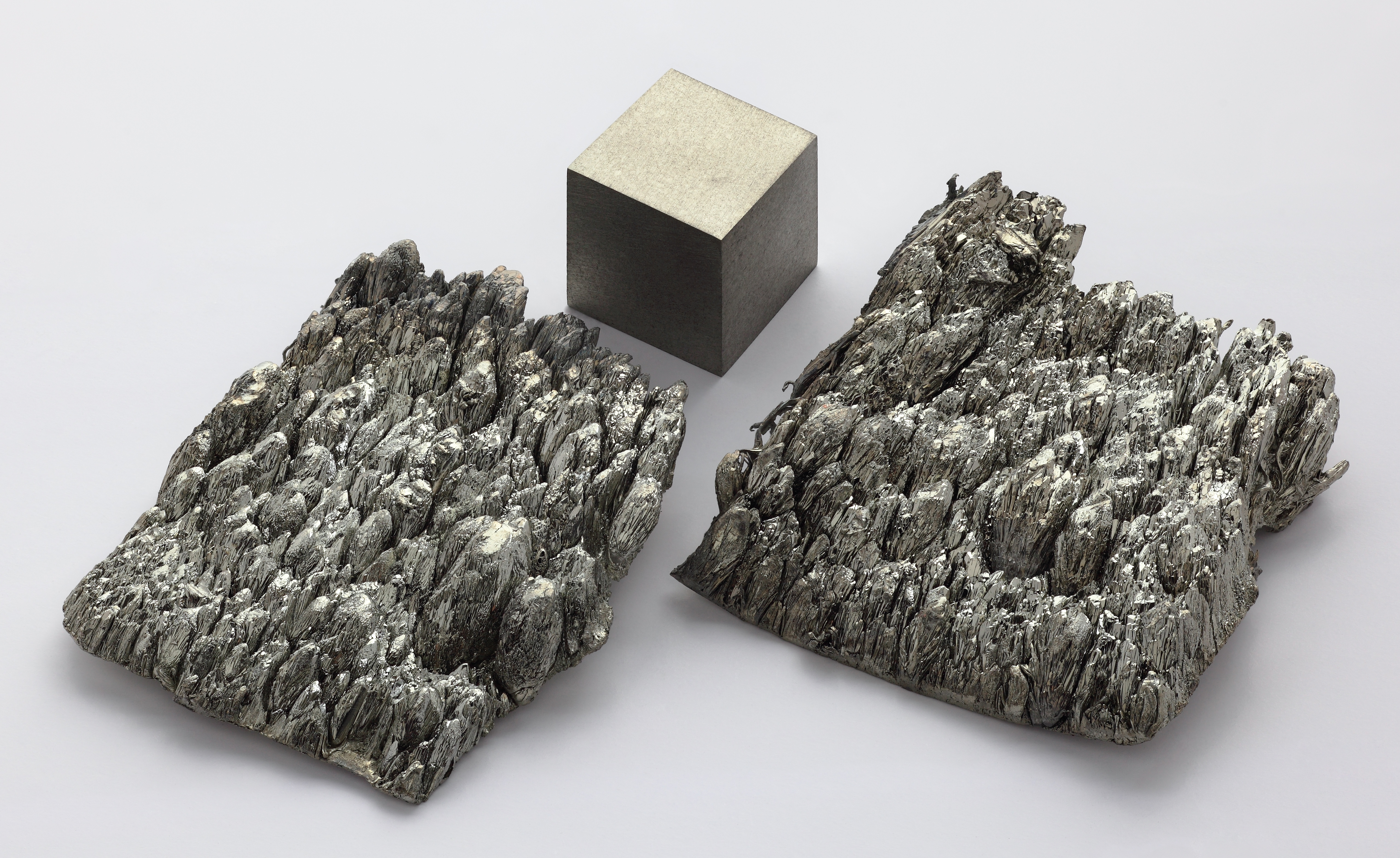
Scandium, including a 1 cm^{3} cube

=== The age of steel ===
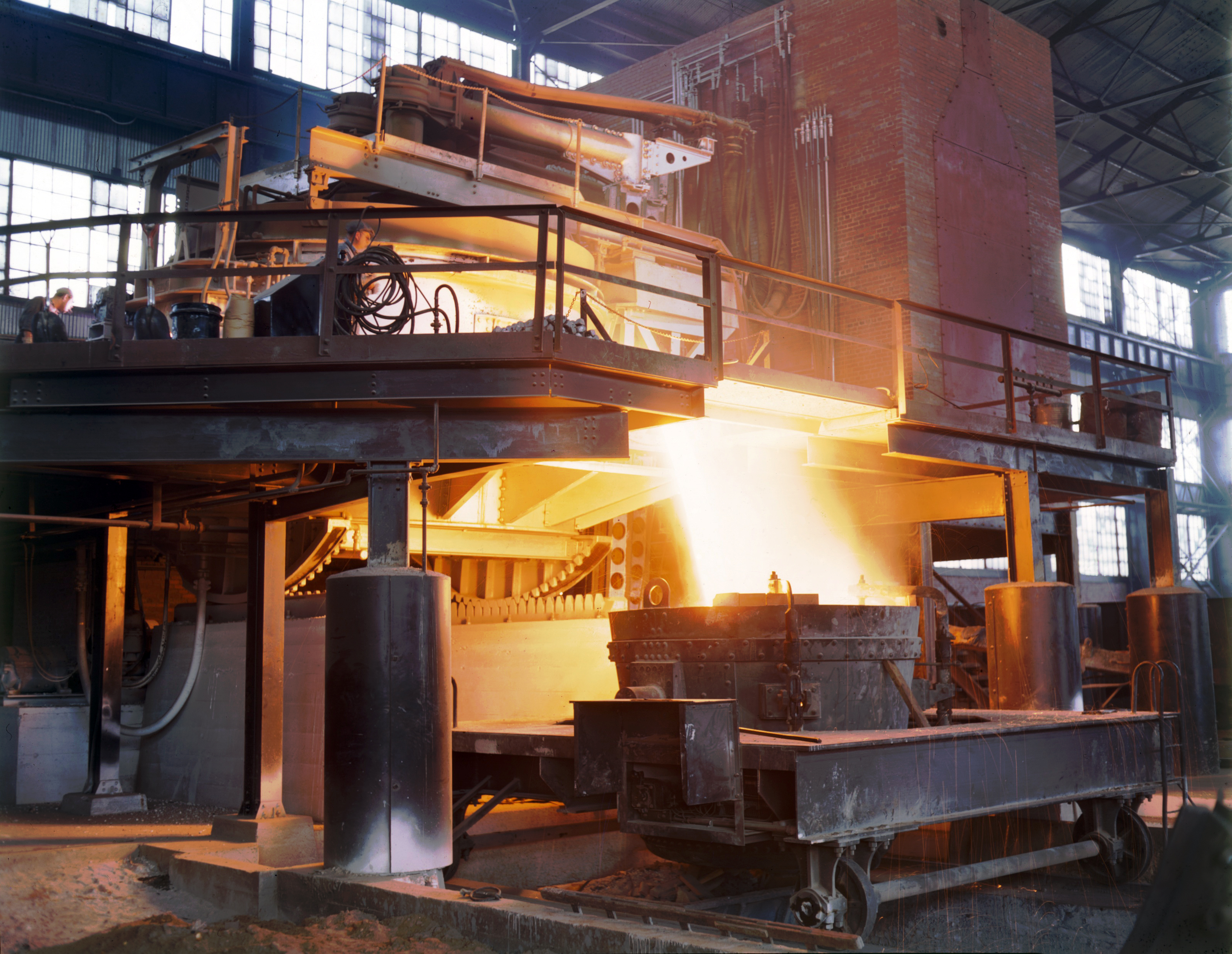
White-hot steel pours like water from a 35-ton electric furnace, at the Allegheny Ludlum Steel Corporation, in Brackenridge, Pennsylvania.

The modern era in steelmaking began with the introduction of Henry Bessemer's Bessemer process in 1855, the raw material for which was pig iron. His method let him produce steel in large quantities cheaply, thus mild steel came to be used for most purposes for which wrought iron was formerly used. The Gilchrist-Thomas process (or basic Bessemer process) was an improvement to the Bessemer process, made by lining the converter with a basic material to remove phosphorus.

Due to its high tensile strength and low cost, steel came to be a major component used in buildings, infrastructure, tools, ships, automobiles, machines, appliances, and weapons.

In 1872, the Englishmen Clark and Woods patented an alloy that would today be considered a stainless steel. The corrosion resistance of iron-chromium alloys had been recognized in 1821 by French metallurgist Pierre Berthier. He noted their resistance against attack by some acids and suggested their use in cutlery. Metallurgists of the 19th century were unable to produce the combination of low carbon and high chromium found in most modern stainless steels, and the high-chromium alloys they could produce were too brittle to be practical. It was not until 1912 that the industrialization of stainless steel alloys occurred in England, Germany, and the United States.

=== The last stable metallic elements ===
By 1900 three metals with atomic numbers less than lead (#82), the heaviest stable metal, remained to be discovered: elements 71, 72, 75.

Von Welsbach, in 1906, proved that the old ytterbium also contained a new element (#71), which he named cassiopeium. Urbain proved this simultaneously, but his samples were very impure and only contained trace quantities of the new element. Despite this, his chosen name lutetium was adopted.

In 1908, Ogawa found element 75 in thorianite but assigned it as element 43 instead of 75 and named it nipponium. In 1925 Walter Noddack, Ida Eva Tacke, and Otto Berg announced its separation from gadolinite and gave it the present name, rhenium.

Georges Urbain claimed to have found element 72 in rare-earth residues, while Vladimir Vernadsky independently found it in orthite. Neither claim was confirmed due to World War I, and neither could be confirmed later, as the chemistry they reported does not match that now known for hafnium. After the war, in 1922, Coster and Hevesy found it by X-ray spectroscopic analysis in Norwegian zircon. Hafnium was thus the last stable element to be discovered, though rhenium was the last to be correctly recognized.

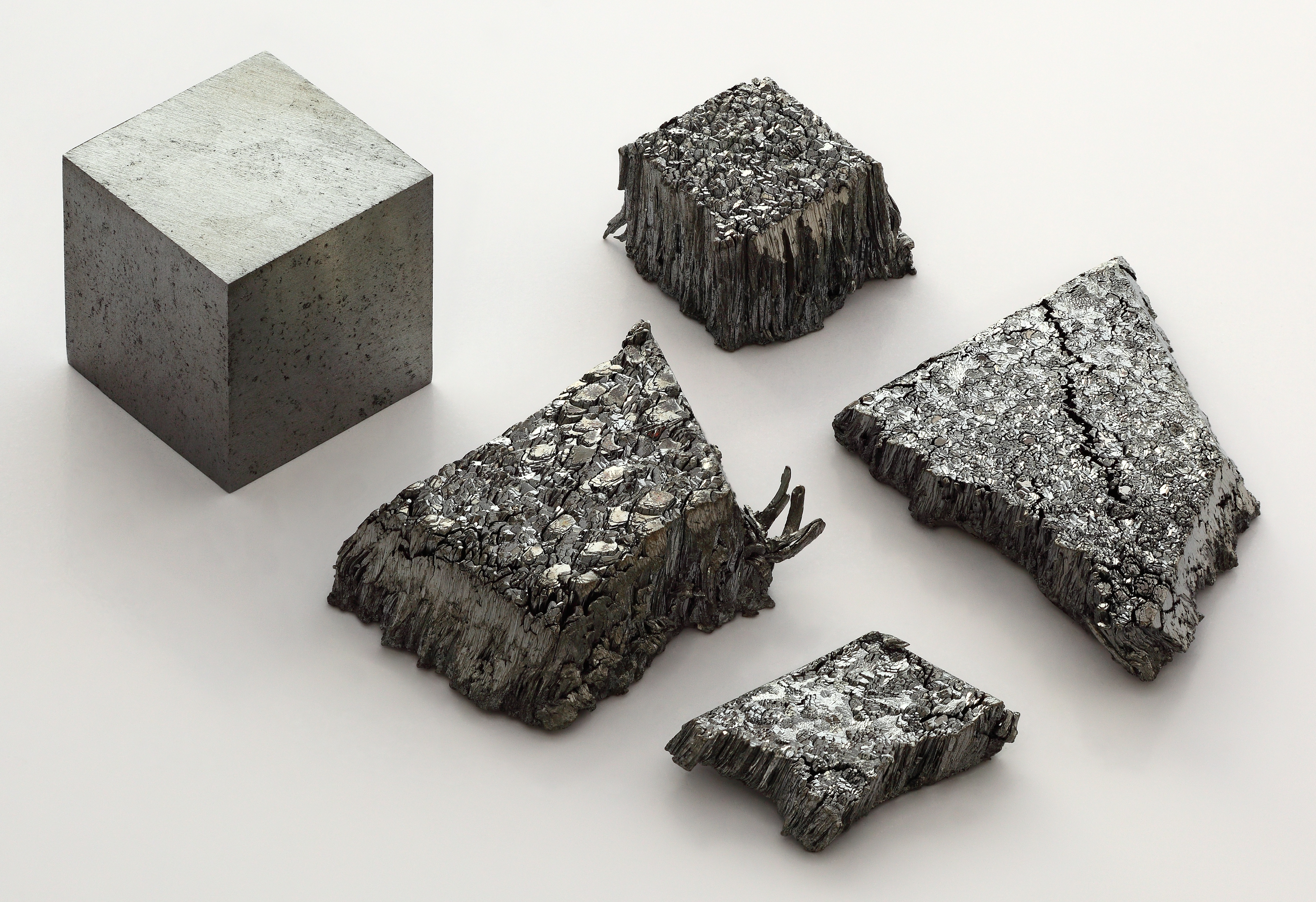
Lutetium, including a 1 cm^{3} cube

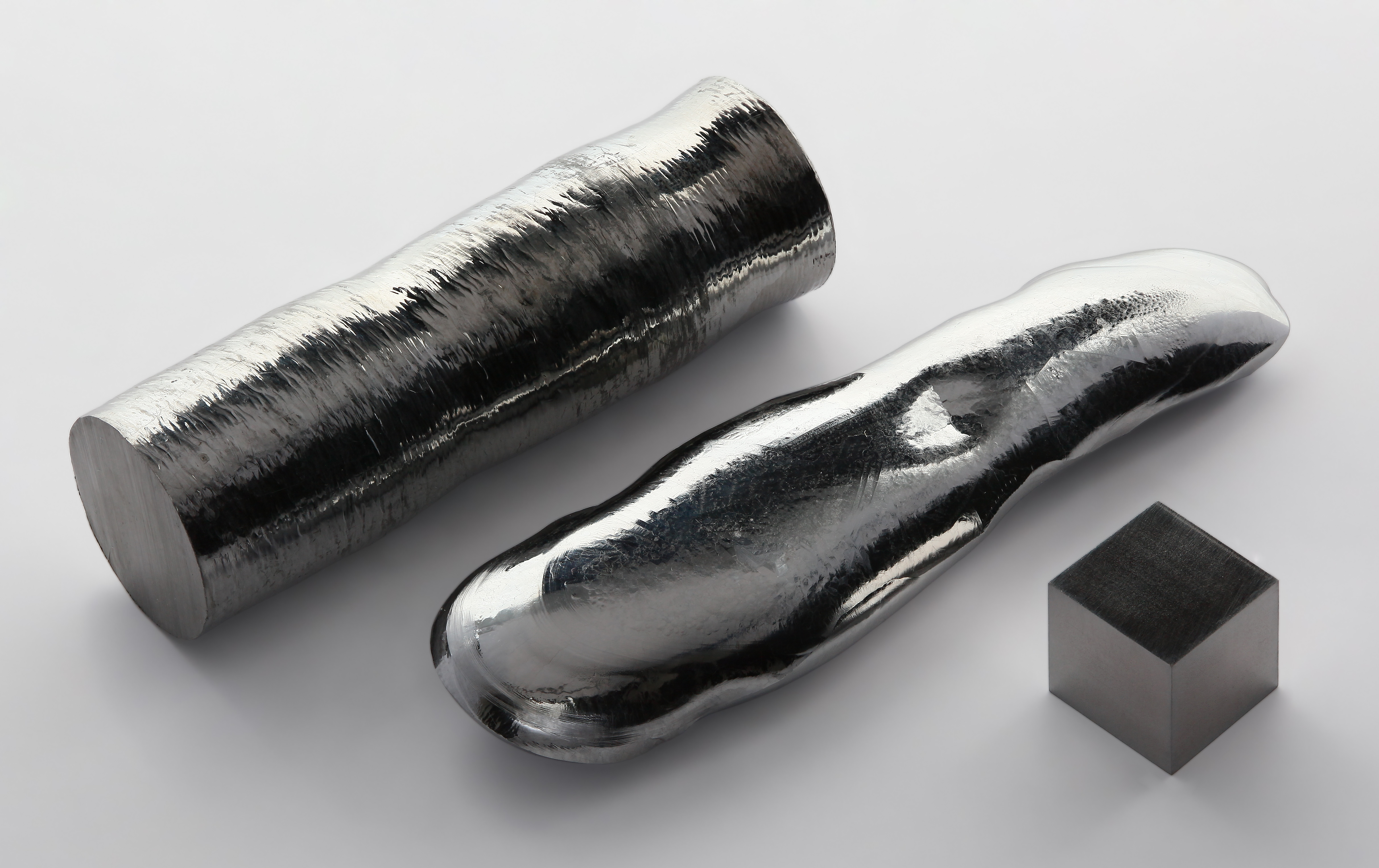
Rhenium, including a 1 cm^{3} cube

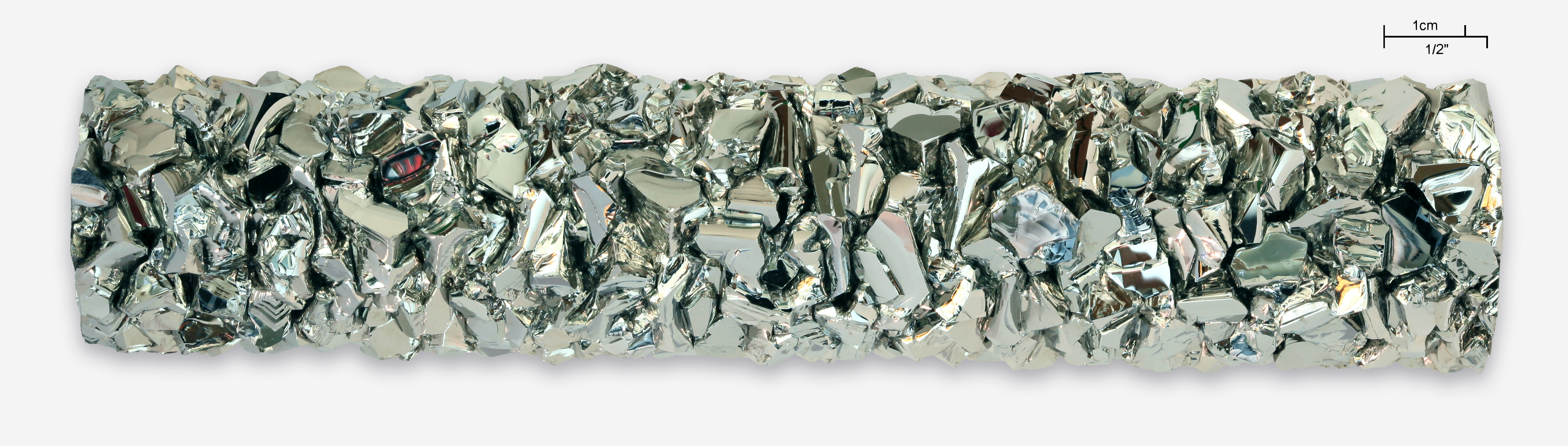
Hafnium, in the form of a 1.7 kg bar

By the end of World War II scientists had synthesized four post-uranium elements, all of which are radioactive (unstable) metals: neptunium (in 1940), plutonium (1940–41), and curium and americium (1944), representing elements 93 to 96. The first two of these were eventually found in nature as well. Curium and americium were by-products of the Manhattan project, which produced the world's first atomic bomb in 1945. The bomb was based on the nuclear fission of uranium, a metal first thought to have been discovered nearly 150 years earlier.

=== Post-World War II developments ===
==== Superalloys ====
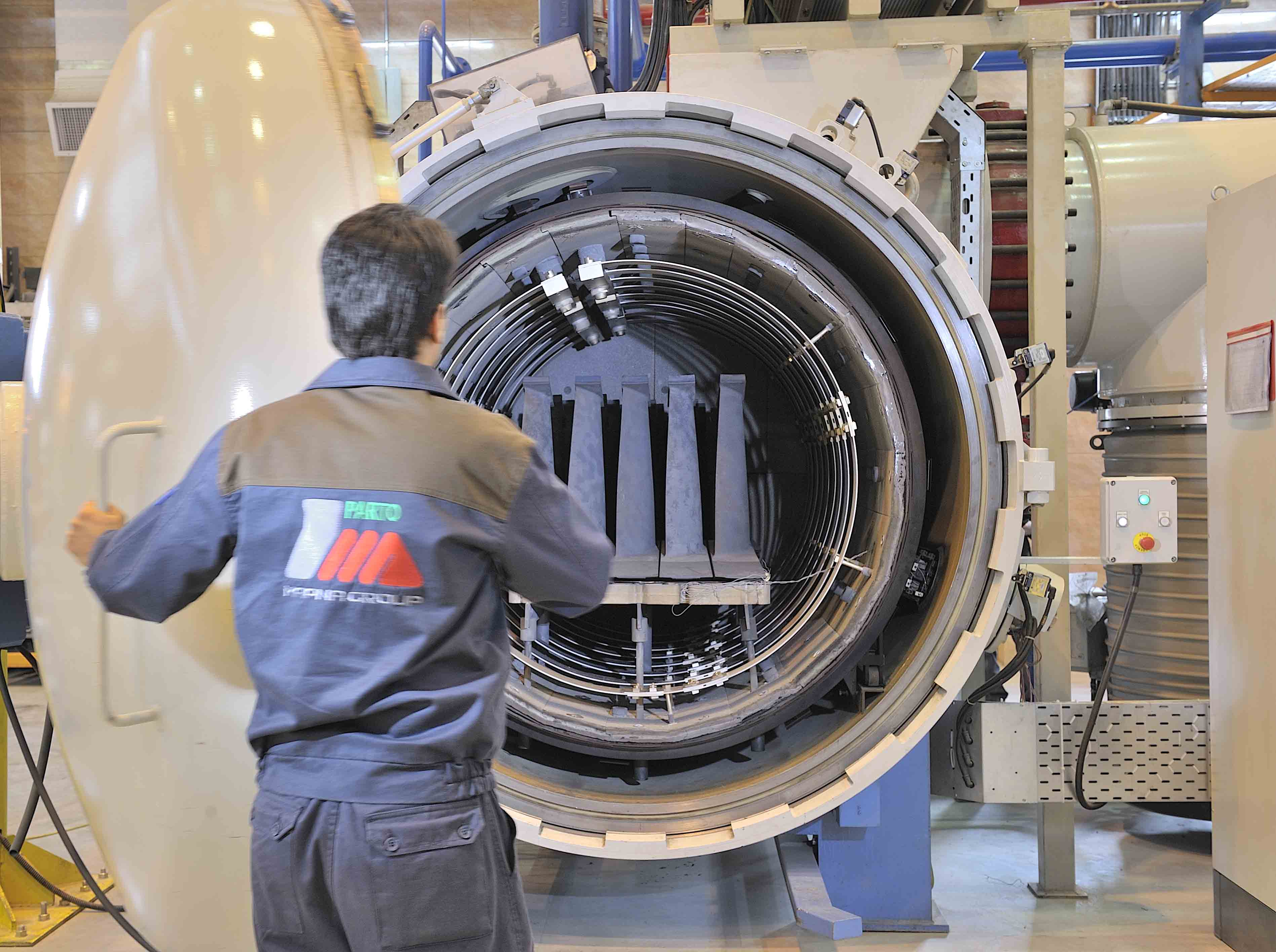
Heat treating superalloy turbine blades

Superalloys composed of combinations of Fe, Ni, Co, and Cr, and lesser amounts of W, Mo, Ta, Nb, Ti, and Al were developed shortly after World War II for use in high performance engines, operating at elevated temperatures (above 650 °C (1,200 °F)). They retain most of their strength under these conditions, for prolonged periods, and combine good low-temperature ductility with resistance to corrosion or oxidation. Superalloys can now be found in a wide range of applications including land, maritime, and aerospace turbines, and chemical and petroleum plants.

==== Transcurium metals ====
The successful development of the atomic bomb at the end of World War II sparked further efforts to synthesize new elements, nearly all of which are, or are expected to be, metals, and all of which are radioactive. It was not until 1949 that element 97 (Berkelium), next after element 96 (Curium), was synthesized by firing alpha particles at an americium target. In 1952, element 100 (Fermium) was found in the debris of the first hydrogen bomb explosion; hydrogen, a nonmetal, had been identified as an element nearly 200 years earlier. Since 1952, elements 101 (Mendelevium) to 118 (Oganesson) have been synthesized.

==== Bulk metallic glasses ====
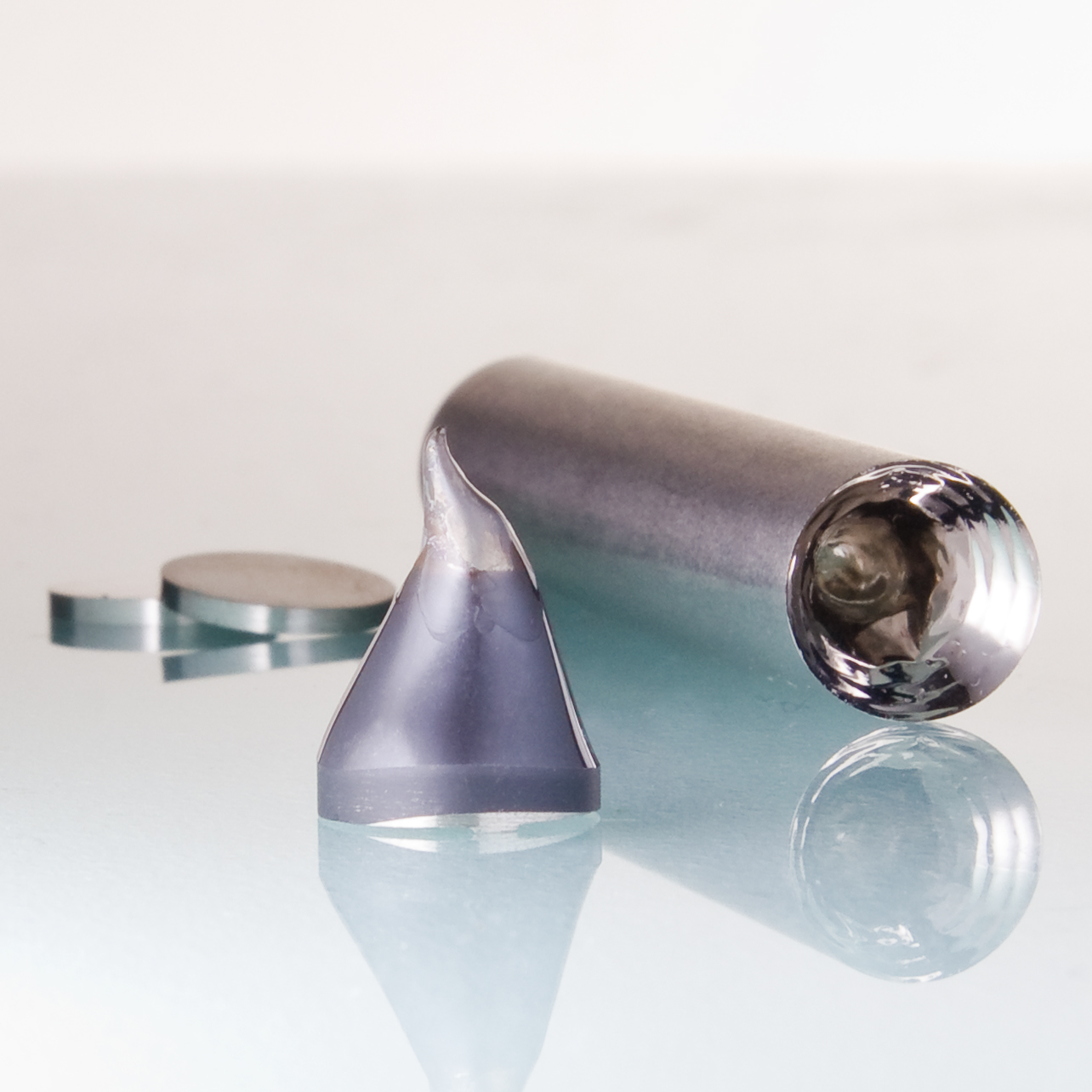
Metallic Glass Vitreloy4

A metallic glass (also known as an amorphous or glassy metal) is a solid metallic material, usually an alloy, with a disordered atomic-scale structure. Most pure and alloyed metals, in their solid state, have atoms arranged in a highly ordered crystalline structure. In contrast these have a non-crystalline glass-like structure. But unlike common glasses, such as window glass, which are typically electrical insulators, amorphous metals have good electrical conductivity. Amorphous metals are produced in several ways, including extremely rapid cooling, physical vapor deposition, solid-state reaction, ion irradiation, and mechanical alloying. The first reported metallic glass was an alloy (Au_{75}Si_{25}) produced at Caltech in 1960. More recently, batches of amorphous steel with three times the strength of conventional steel alloys have been produced. Currently, the most important applications rely on the special magnetic properties of some ferromagnetic metallic glasses. The low magnetization loss is used in high-efficiency transformers. Theft control ID tags and other article surveillance schemes often use metallic glasses because of these magnetic properties.

==== Shape-memory alloys ====
A shape-memory alloy (SMA) is an alloy that "remembers" its original shape and when deformed returns to its pre-deformed shape when heated. While the shape memory effect had been first observed in 1932, in an Au-Cd alloy, it was not until 1962, with the accidental discovery of the effect in a Ni-Ti alloy that research began in earnest, and another ten years before commercial applications emerged. SMA's have applications in robotics and automotive, aerospace, and biomedical industries. There is another type of SMA, called a ferromagnetic shape-memory alloy (FSMA), that changes shape under strong magnetic fields. These materials are of interest as the magnetic response tends to be faster and more efficient than temperature-induced responses.

==== Quasicrystalline alloys ====
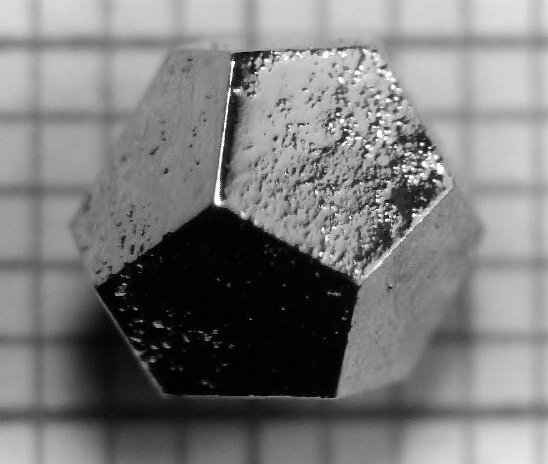
A Ho-Mg-Zn icosahedral quasicrystal formed as a pentagonal dodecahedron, the dual of the icosahedron

In 1984, Israeli metallurgist Dan Shechtman found an aluminium-manganese alloy having five-fold symmetry, in breach of crystallographic convention at the time which said that crystalline structures could only have two-, three-, four-, or six-fold symmetry. Due to reservation about the scientific community's reaction, it took Shechtman two years to publish the results for which he was awarded the Nobel Prize in Chemistry in 2011. Since this time, hundreds of quasicrystals have been reported and confirmed. They exist in many metallic alloys (and some polymers). Quasicrystals are found most often in aluminium alloys (Al-Li-Cu, Al-Mn-Si, Al-Ni-Co, Al-Pd-Mn, Al-Cu-Fe, Al-Cu-V, etc.), but numerous other compositions are also known (Cd-Yb, Ti-Zr-Ni, Zn-Mg-Ho, Zn-Mg-Sc, In-Ag-Yb, Pd-U-Si, etc.). Quasicrystals effectively have infinitely large unit cells. Icosahedrite Al_{63}Cu_{24}Fe_{13}, the first quasicrystal found in nature, was discovered in 2009. Most quasicrystals have ceramic-like properties including low electrical conductivity (approaching values seen in insulators) and low thermal conductivity, high hardness, brittleness, and resistance to corrosion, and non-stick properties. Quasicrystals have been used to develop heat insulation, LEDs, diesel engines, and new materials that convert heat to electricity. New applications may take advantage of the low coefficient of friction and the hardness of some quasicrystalline materials, for example embedding particles in plastic to make strong, hard-wearing, low-friction plastic gears. Other potential applications include selective solar absorbers for power conversion, broad-wavelength reflectors, and bone repair and prostheses applications where biocompatibility, low friction, and corrosion resistance are required.

==== Complex metallic alloys ====
Complex metallic alloys (CMAs) are intermetallic compounds characterized by large unit cells comprising some tens up to thousands of atoms; the presence of well-defined clusters of atoms (frequently with icosahedral symmetry); and partial disorder within their crystalline lattices. They are composed of two or more metallic elements, sometimes with metalloids or chalcogenides added. They include, for example, NaCd2, with 348 sodium atoms and 768 cadmium atoms in the unit cell. Linus Pauling attempted to describe the structure of NaCd_{2} in 1923, but did not succeed until 1955. Potential applications of CMAs include as heat insulation; solar heating; magnetic refrigerators; using waste heat to generate electricity; and coatings for turbine blades in military engines.

==== High-entropy alloys ====
High entropy alloys (HEAs) such as AlLiMgScTi are composed of equal or nearly equal quantities of five or more metals. The term "high-entropy alloys" was coined by Taiwanese scientist Jien-Wei Yeh because the entropy increase of mixing is substantially higher when there is a larger number of elements in the mix, and their proportions are more nearly equal. Some alternative names, such as multi-component alloys, compositionally complex alloys and multi-principal-element alloys are also used in the literature. These alloys are currently the focus of significant attention in materials science and engineering because they have potentially desirable properties. Furthermore, research indicates that some HEAs have considerably better strength-to-weight ratios, with a higher degree of fracture resistance, tensile strength, and corrosion and oxidation resistance than conventional alloys. Although HEAs have been studied since the 1980s, research substantially accelerated starting in the 2010s.

==== MAX phase ====
MAX phase alloy examples
MAX	M	A	X
Hf_{2}SnC	Hf	Sn	C
Ti_{4}AlN_{3}	Ti	Al	N
Ti_{3}SiC_{2}	Ti	Si	C
Ti_{2}AlC	Ti	Al	C
Cr_{2}AlC_{2}	Cr	Al	C
Ti_{3}AlC_{2}	Ti	Al	C

In a MAX phase, M is an early transition metal, A is an A group element (mostly group IIIA and IVA, or groups 13 and 14), and X is either carbon or nitrogen. Examples are Hf_{2}SnC and Ti_{4}AlN_{3}. Such alloys have high electrical and thermal conductivity, thermal shock resistance, damage tolerance, machinability, high elastic stiffness, and low thermal expansion coefficients. They can be polished to a metallic luster because of their excellent electrical conductivities. Some MAX phases are also highly resistant to chemical attack (e.g. Ti_{3}SiC_{2}) and high-temperature oxidation in air (Ti_{2}AlC, Cr_{2}AlC_{2}, and Ti_{3}AlC_{2}). Potential applications for MAX phase alloys include: as tough, machinable, thermal shock-resistant refractories; high-temperature heating elements; coatings for electrical contacts; and neutron irradiation resistant parts for nuclear applications.

== See also ==
- Bimetal
- Colored gold
- Ductility
- Ferrous metallurgy
- Metal theft
- Metal toxicity
- Metallic hydrogen
- Metallurgy
- Metals of antiquity
- Metalworking
- Mineral (nutrient)
- Polymetallic ore
- Properties of metals, metalloids and nonmetals
- Structural steel
- Transition metal
