= Electrum =

Alloy of gold and silver

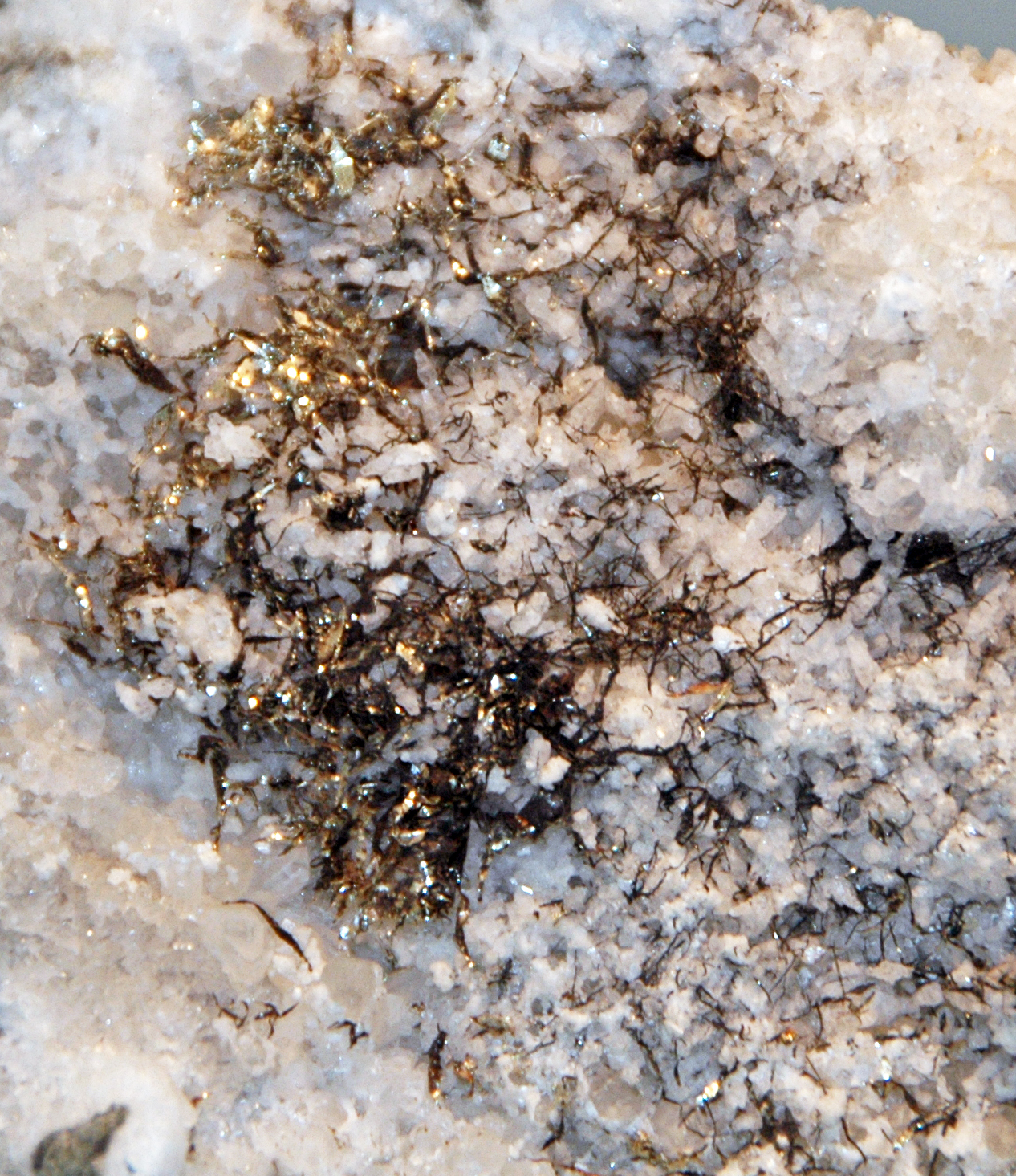
Natural electrum "wires" on quartz, historic specimen from the old Smuggler-Union Mine, Telluride, Colorado, USA

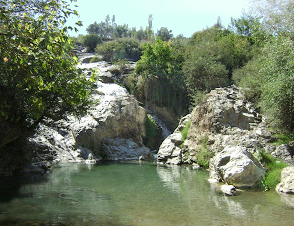
The Pactolus river, from which Lydia obtained electrum for its early coinage

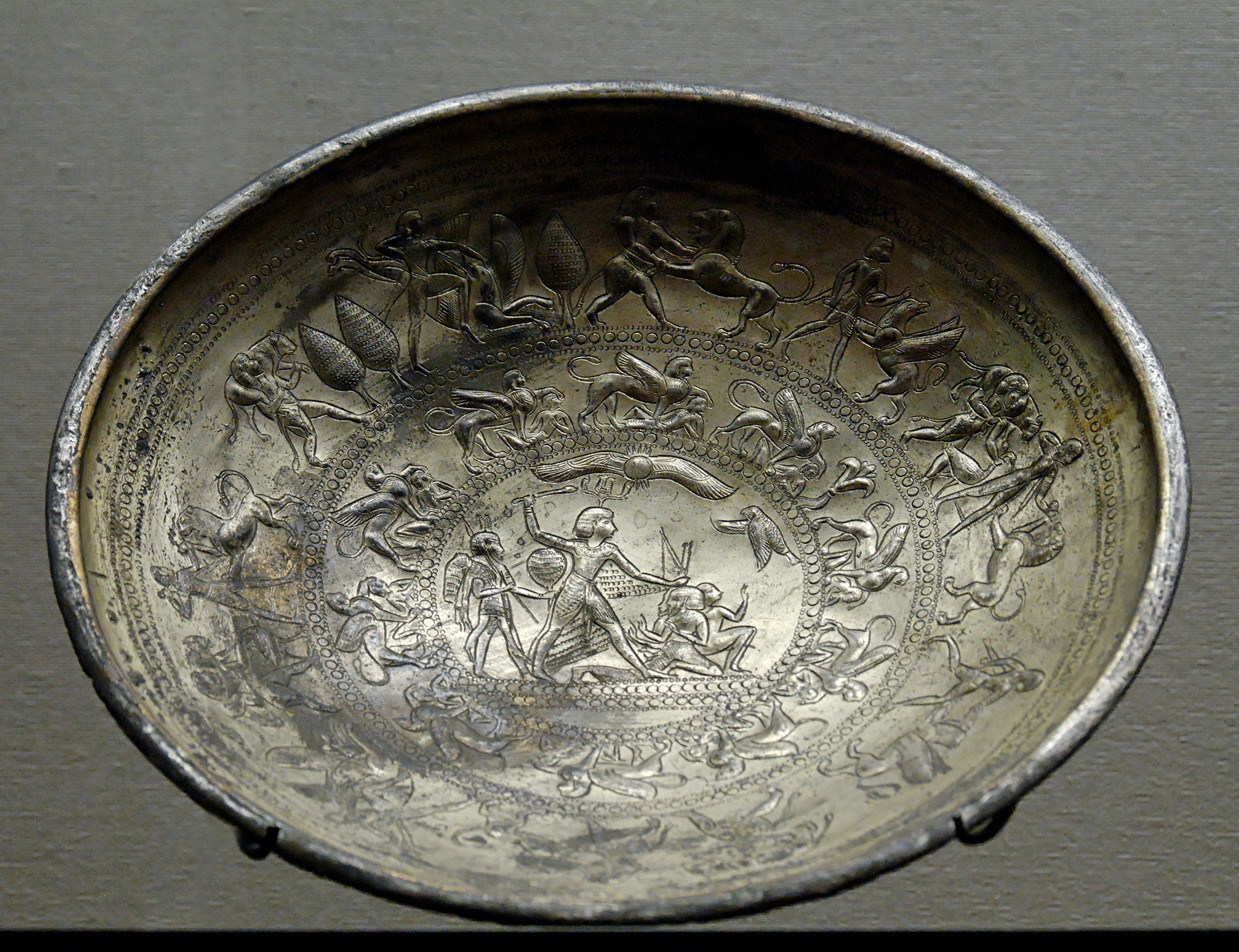
Electrum Phoenician bowl with mythological scenes, a sphinx frieze and the representation of a king vanquishing his enemies, Cypro-Archaic I, from Idalion, 8th–7th centuries BC (Louvre, Paris)

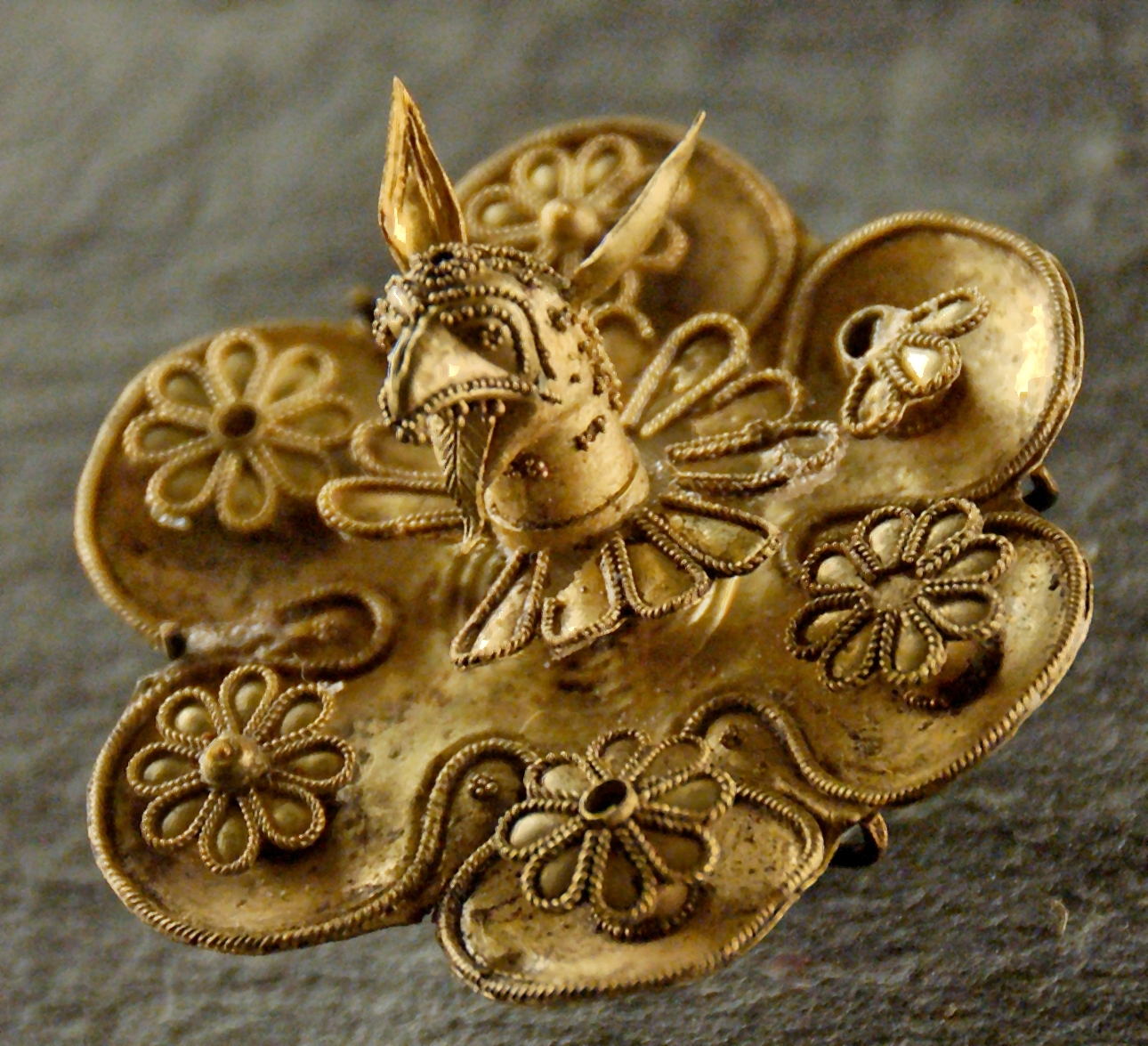
Brooch with a griffin protome, from the necropolis of Kameiros, Rhodes, c. 625–600 BC (Louvre)

Electrum is a naturally occurring alloy of gold and silver, with trace amounts of copper and other metals. Its color ranges from pale to bright yellow, depending on the proportions of gold and silver. It has been produced artificially and is also known as green gold, though the color is more pale yellow than green.

Electrum was used as early as the third millennium BC in the Old Kingdom of Egypt, sometimes as an exterior coating to the pyramidia atop ancient Egyptian pyramids and obelisks. It was also used in the making of ancient drinking vessels. The first known metal coins made were of electrum, dating back to the end of the 7th century or the beginning of the 6th century BC.

== Etymology ==
The name electrum is the Latinized form of the ancient Greek word ἤλεκτρον (ḗlektron), meaning amber or an alloy of gold and silver. Electrum was often referred to as "white gold" in ancient times.

== Composition ==
Electrum consists primarily of gold and silver but is sometimes found with traces of platinum, copper, and other metals. The term is mostly used informally for compositions containing 20–80% gold and 80–20% silver, but these are strictly called gold or silver, respectively, depending on the dominant element. Analysis of the composition of electrum in ancient Greek coinage dating from about 600 BC shows that the gold content was about 55.5% in the coinage issued by Phocaea. In the early classical period, the gold content of electrum ranged from 46% in Phocaea to 43% in Mytilene. In later coinage from these areas, dating to 326 BC, the gold content averaged 40% to 41%. In the Hellenistic period, electrum coins with a regularly decreasing proportion of gold were issued by the Carthaginians. In the later Eastern Roman Empire, which was controlled from Constantinople, the purity of the gold coinage was reduced.

== History ==
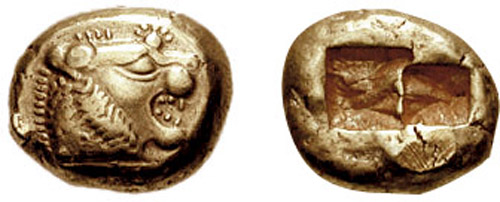
Lydian electrum coin (one-third stater), one of the oldest known coins, early 6th century BC

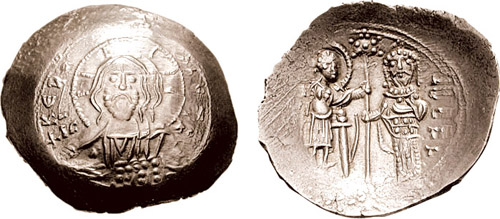
Electrum coin of the Byzantine Emperor Alexius I Comnenus, c. 1080

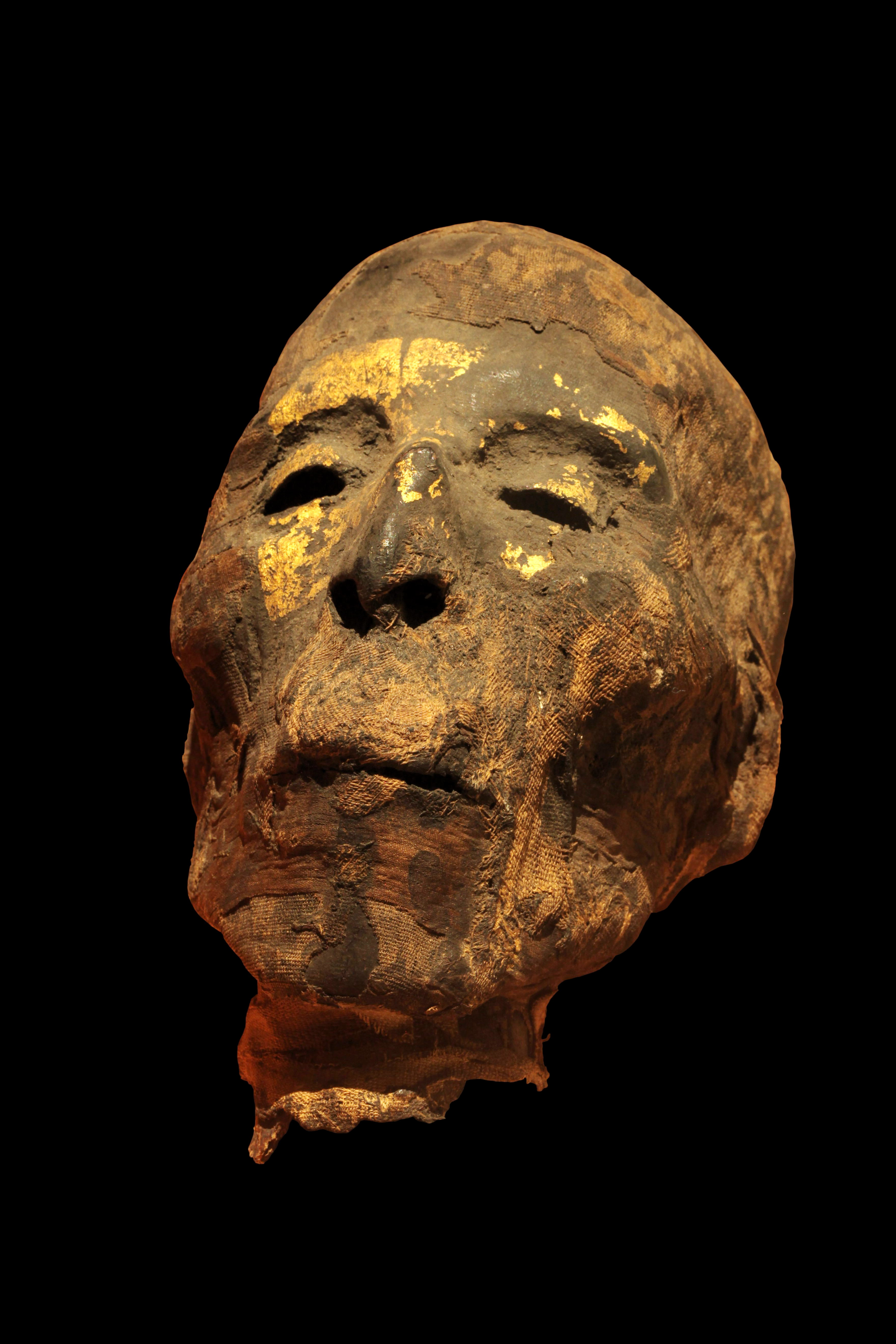
A mummified male head covered in electrum, from Ancient Egypt, Roman period, 2nd century AD (Musée des beaux-arts de Lyon)

Electrum is mentioned in an account of an expedition sent by Pharaoh Sahure of the Fifth Dynasty of Egypt. It is also discussed by Pliny the Elder in his Naturalis Historia.

=== Early coinage ===
The earliest known electrum coins, Lydian coins and East Greek coins found under the Temple of Artemis at Ephesus, are currently dated to the first half of the 7th century BC (c.650 BC). Electrum is believed to have been used in coins c. 650-575BC in Lydia during the reign of Alyattes.

Electrum was much better for coinage than gold, mostly because it was harder and more durable, but also because techniques for refining gold were not widespread at the time. The gold content of naturally occurring electrum in modern western Anatolia ranges from 70% to 90%, in contrast to the 45–55% of gold in electrum used in ancient Lydian coinage of the same geographical area. This suggests that the Lydians had already developed silver-refining technology and were adding refined silver to local native electrum some decades before introducing pure silver coins.

In Lydia, electrum was minted into coins weighing 4.7 grams (0.17 oz), each valued at 1/3 stater (meaning "standard"). Three of these coins—with a weight of about 14.1 grams (0.50 oz)—totaled one stater, about one month's pay for a soldier. To complement the stater, fractions were made: the trite (third), the hekte (sixth), and so forth, including 1/24 of a stater, and even down to 1/48 and 1/96 of a stater. The 1/96 stater was about 0.14 grams (0.0049 oz) to 0.15 grams (0.0053 oz). Larger denominations, such as a one-stater coin, were also minted.

Because of variation in the composition of electrum, it was difficult to determine the exact worth of each coin. This problem hampered widespread trading, as the "intrinsic" metallic value of each electrum coin could not be easily determined.

These difficulties were eliminated c. 570 BC when the Croeseids, coins of pure gold and silver, were introduced. However, electrum currency remained common until approximately 350 BC. The simplest reason for this was that, because of the gold content, one 14.1 gram stater was worth as much as ten 14.1 gram silver pieces.

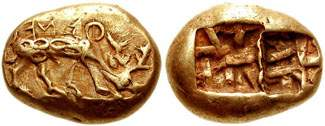
Electrum coin from Ephesus, 620–600 BC

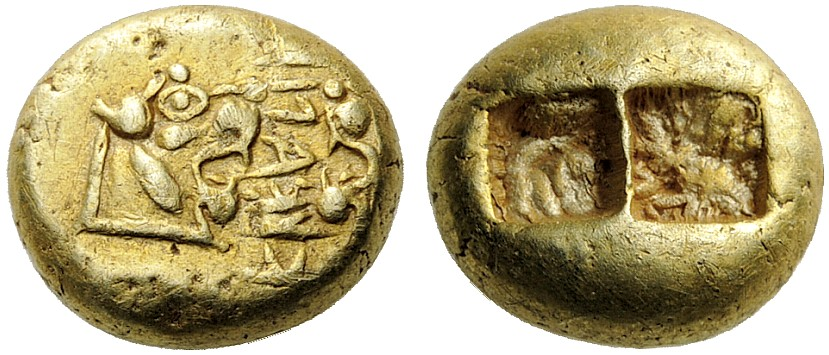
Electrum trite of Alyattes of Lydia, 610–560 BC

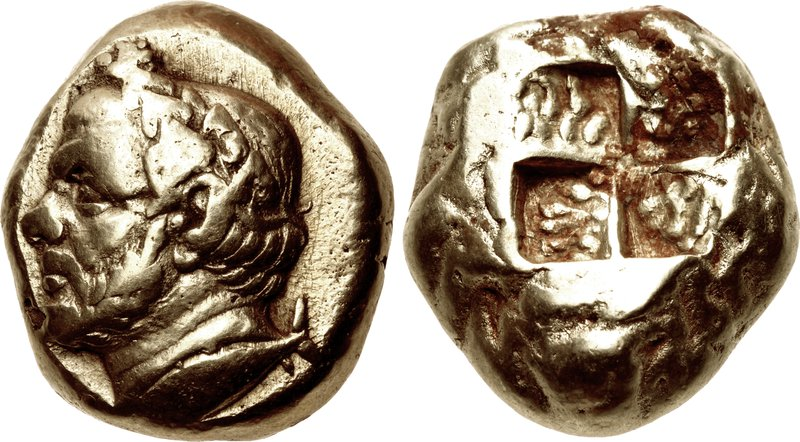
Electrum coin from Cyzicus, Mysia, early–mid 4th century BC

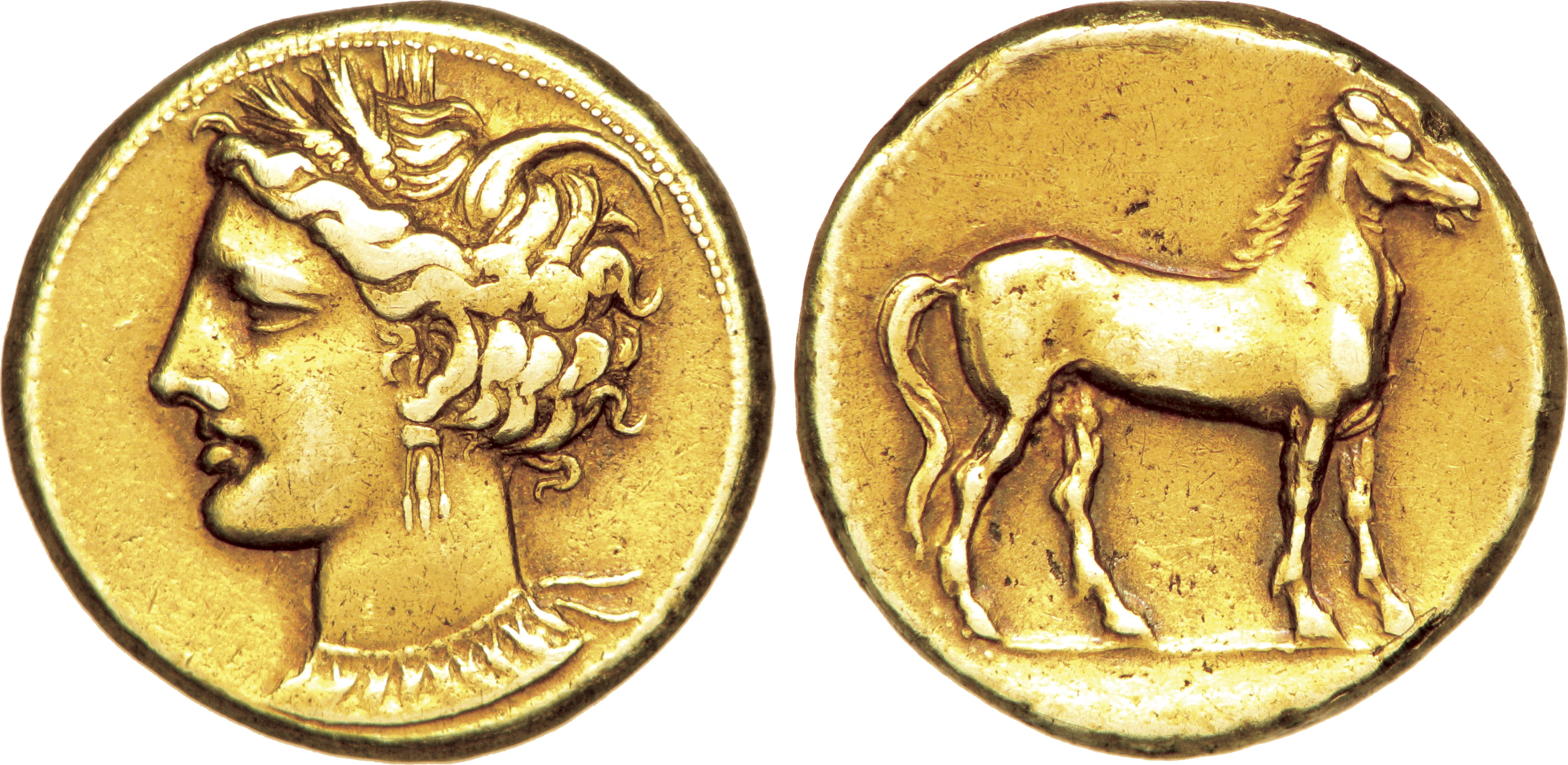
Electrum stater, Carthage, c. 300 BC

== See also ==
- Corinthian bronze – a highly prized alloy in antiquity that may have contained electrum
- Crown gold – A 22-carat gold alloy highly valued for its use in gold coins from the 16th century onwards
- Hepatizon
- Orichalcum – another distinct metal or alloy mentioned in texts from classical antiquity, later used to refer to brass
- Panchaloha
- Shakudō – a Japanese billon of gold and copper with a dark blue-purple patina
- Shibuichi – another Japanese alloy known for its patina
- Thokcha – an alloy of meteoric iron or "thunderbolt iron" commonly used in Tibet
- Tumbaga – a similar material, originating in Pre-Columbian America
