= Black bronze =

Black bronze can refer to:

- Hepatizon, also known as black Corinthian bronze
- Shakudō, a Japanese decorative billon
