= Guanín =

Pre-Columbian central American alloy

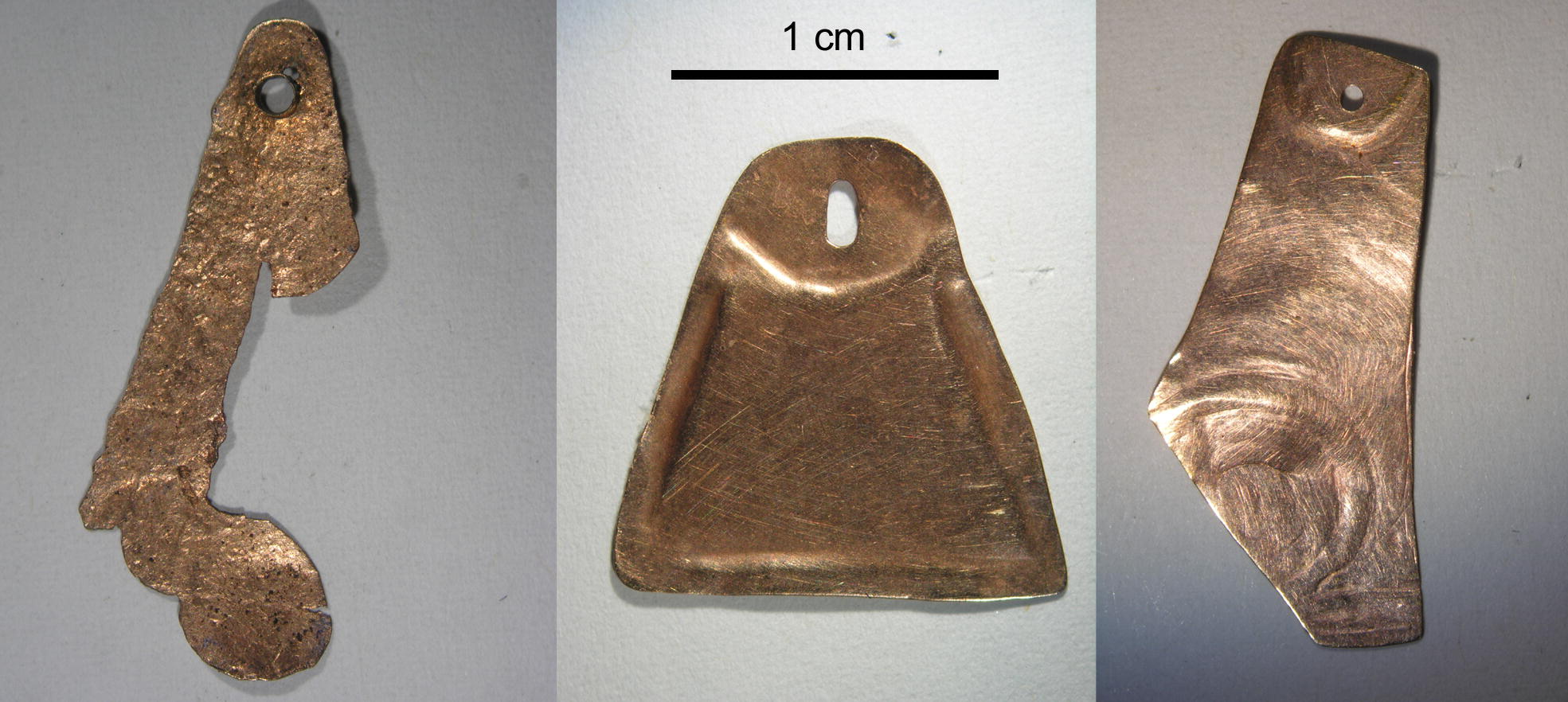
Guanín objects made by the Taínos excavated in Cuba.

Guanín is an alloy of copper, gold and silver, similar to red gold, used in pre-Columbian central America. The name guanín is taken from the language of the Taíno people, who prized it for its reddish color, brilliant shine, and unique smell, and associated it with both worldly and supernatural power. It was also known as taguagua, and in South America as tumbaga. The Spanish referred to it as "low gold", distinguishing it from items made with a higher purity of gold.

Samples of guanín have been found all over central America, indicating a great deal of trade and interaction between the many cultures that lived in the area. Guanín was used to create and decorate a variety of objects, including both humanoid and animal figurines using lost-wax casting, and hammered ceremonial medallions also referred to as guanín. For many years, guanín was one of the most important valuables for long-distance trade in and around central America and the Caribbean basin.

== Composition and characteristics ==
Guanín is composed of copper, gold, and silver. Spanish royal assayers in 1498 found that samples of guanín sent to them by Christopher Columbus were 18 parts gold, 6 parts silver, and 8 parts copper, of 32 parts total. This amounts to approximately 56% gold, 18% silver, and 25% copper. Western explorers initially believed that guanín was a naturally occurring alloy. However, modern analyses have shown that the copper levels in guanín are consistently high, in excess of 25%, which indicates that high-heat smelting must have been used to create the alloy.

The brilliant shine of polished guanín was a major part of its importance to the Taíno, who valued an "aesthetic of brilliance" which associated light and light-reflecting objects with spiritual energy. This spiritual energy was thought to have "healing and energizing qualities", which in turn were associated with fertility and high social status. The association between light and power was strong enough that some chiefs were named for the material, such as the Taíno chief Behechio, who had the epithet Tureywa Hobin, "king as dazzling and heavenly as guanín".

The Taíno regarded the smell of guanín as an important part of its attraction. It was similar to that of the plant the Taíno called taguagua, which was well known for its strong scent. It has been suggested that this name refers to the gold-flowered guanina plant, which is identified as Senna occidentalis in modern taxonomy. When the Spanish brought brass to the Caribbean, the Taíno treated it as valuable and sacred, an assessment based at least in part on the similarity of the smell of brass to that of guanín.

== History ==
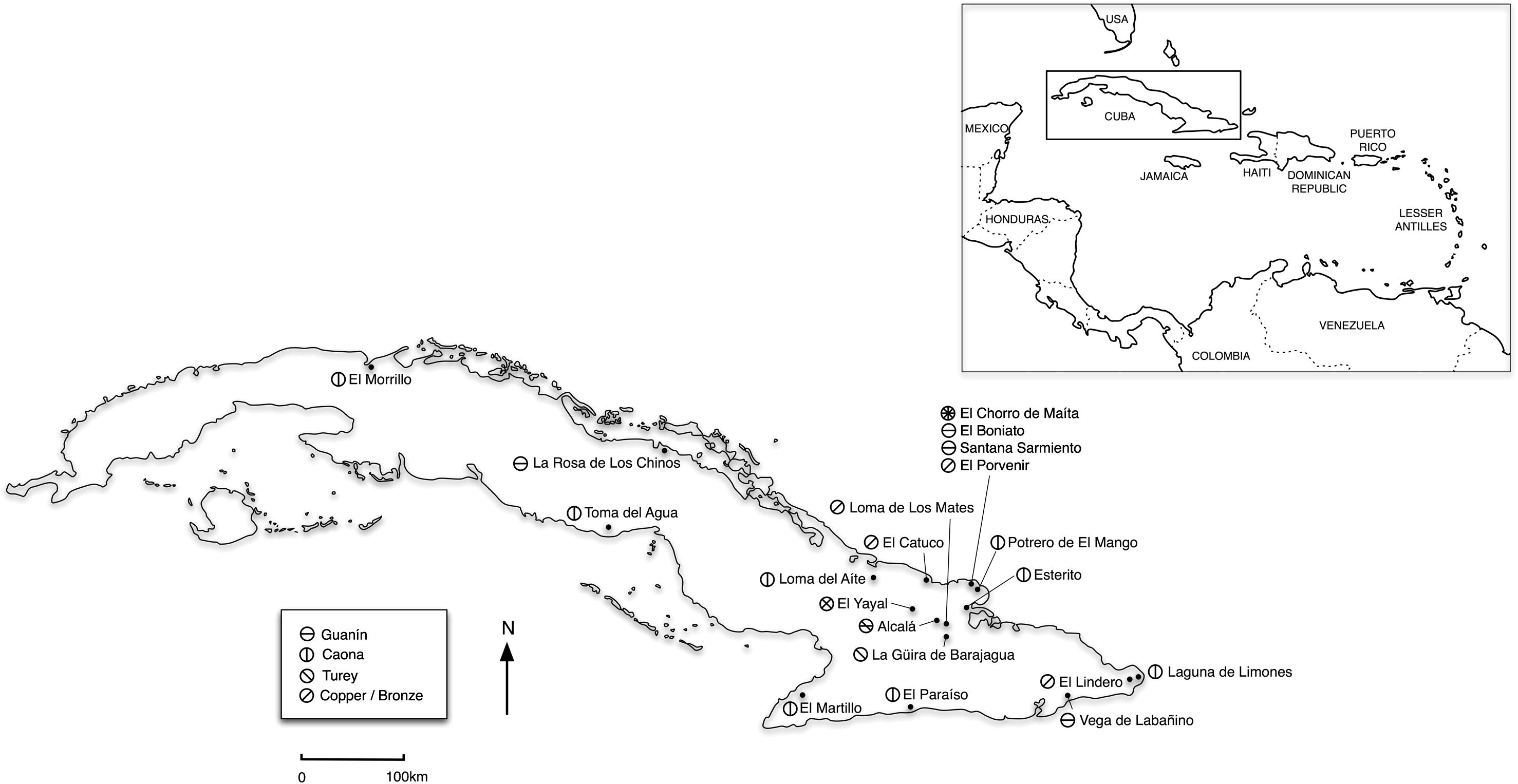
Location of Guanín finds in Cuba

Guanín has been in use in the Caribbean basin since at least the 1st century, if not earlier. Pieces from the central Andes have been dated to around that time, and sheets of guanín found in Puerto Rico have been radiocarbon dated to between 70 and 374 AD.

The journal of Bartolomé de las Casas made during the third voyage of Christopher Columbus in 1498 relates that Columbus had heard reports from local peoples that "there had come to Española from the south and south-east, a black people who have the tops of their spears made of a metal which they call guanín".

A royal bill from 1501 made the sale of guanín illegal in Hispaniola. During the 1520s, it was sometimes used as an alternate currency when coins were scarce. It was used to purchase indigenous slaves in northern South America during this period.

== Uses ==
The Taíno primarily made use of the alloy to produce hammered ceremonial medallions which were also referred to as guanín. These medallions symbolized the social and political power of the cacique, or chief, and were exchanged to celebrate occasions of social importance such as marriages, alliances, and visits among the social elite. Particularly, the exchange of guanín objects during marriage rituals was associated to myths related to gender, creation, and societal renewal.

Guanín was also used to decorate socially valuable guaiza masks.

== See also ==
- Tumbaga – Alloy of gold and copper used in pre-Columbian Mesoamerica
