= Phurba =

Tibetan ritual implement

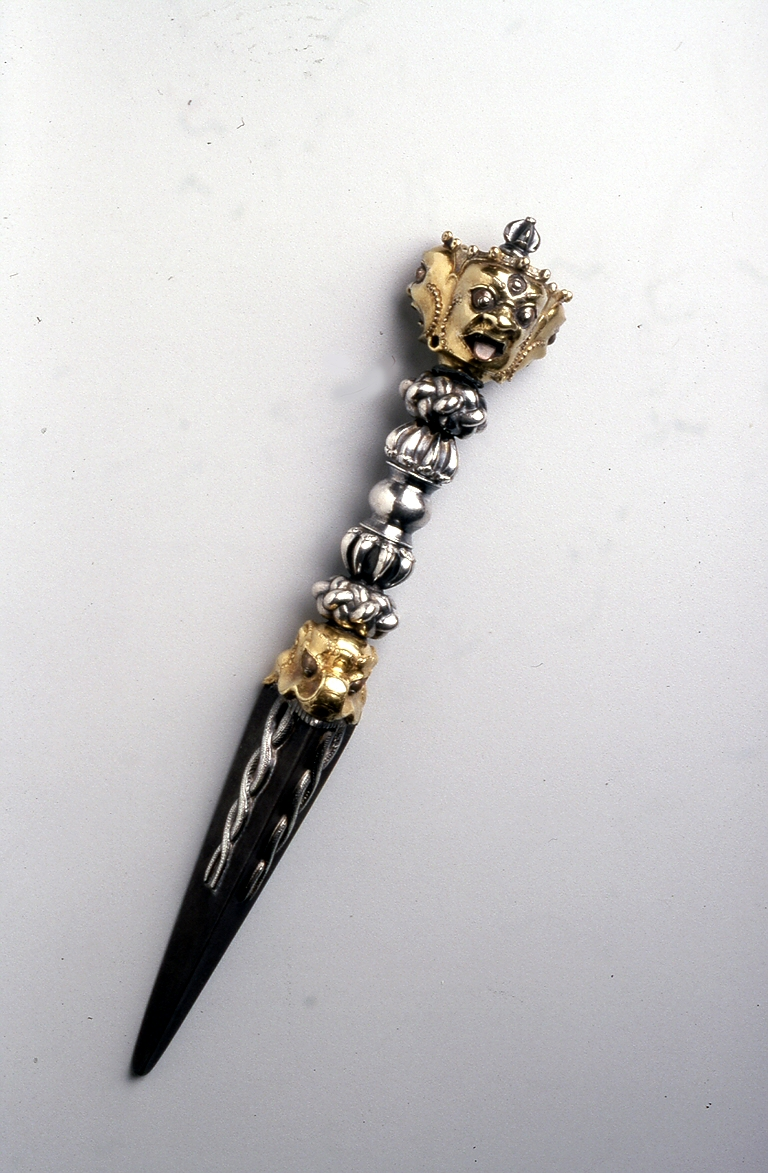
Phurba in the Walters Art Museum

The phurba (Tibetan: ཕུར་པ or ཕུར་བ, Wylie: phur pa or phur ba; alternate transliterations: phurpa, phurbu, purbha, or phurpu) or kīla (Sanskrit Devanagari: कील; IAST: kīla) is a three-sided peg, stake, knife, or nail-like ritual implement traditionally associated with Indo-Tibetan Buddhism, Bön, and Indian Vedic traditions.

== Etymology ==
Most of what is known of the Indian kīla lore has come by way of Tibetan culture. Scholars such as F. A. Bischoff, Charles Hartman and Martin Boord have shown that the Tibetan literature widely asserts that the Sanskrit for their term phurba is kīlaya (with or without the long i). However, as Boord describes it,

all dictionaries and Sanskrit works agree the word to be kīla (or kīlaka). I suppose this [discrepancy] to result from an indiscriminate use by Tibetans of the dative singular kīlaya. This form would have been familiar to them in the simple salutation namo vajrakīlaya (homage to Vajrakīla) from which it could easily be assumed by those unfamiliar with the technicalities of Sanskrit that the name of the deity is Vajrakīlaya instead of Vajrakīla. The term (vajra)kīlaya is frequently found in Sanskrit texts (as well as in virtually every kīlamantra) legitimately used as the denominative verb 'to spike', 'transfix', 'nail down', etc.

Mayer (1996) contests Boord's assertion, pointing out that eminent Sanskritists such as Sakya Pandita employed Vajrakīlaya. Further, he argues:

it is possible, on the other hand, that the name Vajrakīlaya as favoured by the Tibetans could in fact have been the form that was actually used in the original Indic sources, and that there is no need to hypothesize a correct form "Vajrakīla". "Vajrakīlaya" could have come from the second person singular active, causative imperative, of the verb Kīl. Indigenous grammar (Pāṇini Dhātupāṭha I.557) gives to Kīl the meaning of bandha, i.e. "to bind", while Monier-Williams (285) gives the meanings 'to bind, fasten, stake, pin'. Hence the form kīlaya could mean 'you cause to bind/transfix!', or 'bind/transfix!'. This, taken from mantras urging "bind/transfix", or "may you cause to bind/transfix", might have come to be treated as a noun; and the noun might then have become deified; hence Kīlaya might have started out as a deified imperative, in some ways comparable to the famous example of the deified vocative in the name Hevajra, and a not unheard of phenomenon in Sanskrit tantric literature. This suggestion is supported by Alexis Sanderson, a specialist in Sanskrit tantric manuscripts whom I consulted on this problem.

== Fabrication and components ==
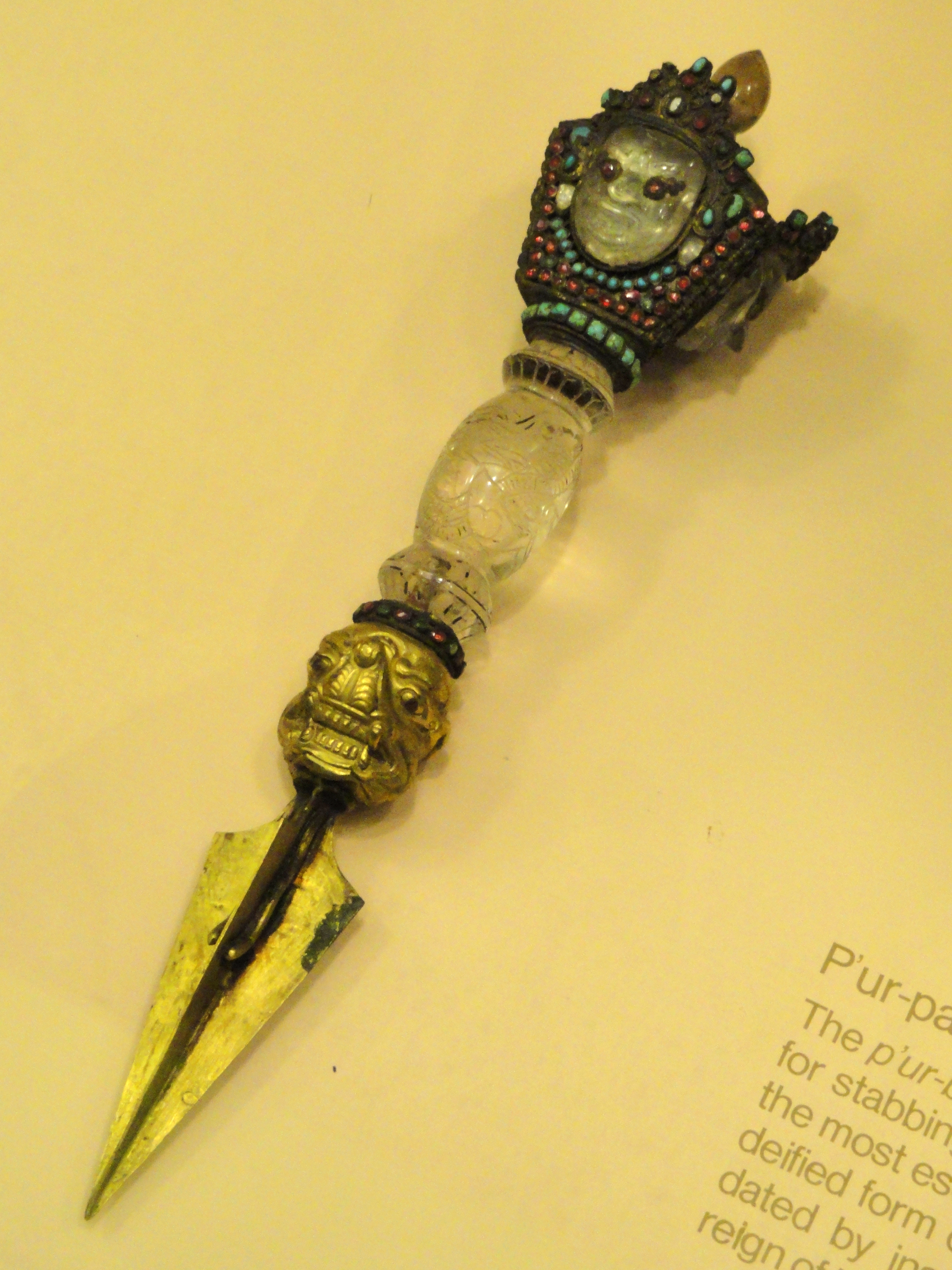
Phurba in the Asian collection of the American Museum of Natural History

The fabrication of phurba is quite diverse. Having pommel, handle, and blade, phurba are often segmented into suites of triunes on both the horizontal and vertical axes, although there are notable exceptions. This compositional arrangement highlights the numerological importance and spiritual energy of the integers three and nine. Phurba may be constituted and constructed of different materials and material components, such as wood, metal, clay, bone, gems, horn or crystal.

Like the majority of traditional Tibetan metal instruments, the phurba is often made from brass and iron (terrestrial and/or meteoric iron. 'Thokcha' (Tibetan: ཐོག་ལྕགས, Wylie: thog lcags) means 'thunder-iron' in Tibetan and refers to tektites and meteorites which are often high in iron content. Meteoric iron was highly prized throughout the Himalaya where it was included in sophisticated polymetallic alloys such as Panchaloha for ritual implements. The pommel of the phurba often bears three faces of Vajrakīla, one joyful, one peaceful, one wrathful, but may bear the umbrella of the ashtamangala or mushroom cap, Yidam (like Hayagriva), snow lion, or stupa, among other possibilities. The handle is often of a vajra, weaving or knotwork design. The handle generally has a triune form as is common to the pommel and blade. The blade is usually composed of three triangular facets or faces, meeting at the tip. These represent, respectively, the blade's power to transform the negative energies known as the "three poisons" or "root poisons" (Sanskrit: mula klesha) of attachment/craving/desire, delusion/ignorance/misconception, and aversion/fear/hate.

== Ritual usage ==
Cantwell and Mayer (2008) have studied a number of texts recovered from the cache of the Dunhuang manuscripts that discuss the phurba and its ritual usage.

The phurba is one of many iconographic representations of divine symbolic attributes (Tibetan: phyag mtshan) of Vajrayana and Hindu deities. When consecrated and bound for usage, (Note: A working phurba has the face(s), pommel and hilt bound (depending on the nature of the phurba) with fabric [often green according to Müller-Ebeling, Rätsch & Shahi 2002] and in this binding rite Vajrakilaya is installed in the tool as a Nirmanakaya manifestation, by association the tool accesses all three realms of the Trikaya.) Phurba are a nirmanakaya manifestation of Vajrakīlaya.

Chandra, et al. in their dictionary entry 'korkor' (Tibetan: ཀོར་ཀོར, Wylie: kor kor), 'coiled' (English) relates that the text titled the 'Vaidūry Ngonpo' (Tibetan: བཻ་ཌཱུརྻ་སྔོན་པོ, Wylie: bai dUry sngon po) has the passage: ཐག་བ་ཕུར་བ་ལ་ཀོར་ཀོར་བྱམ, 'a string was wound round the (exorcist's) dagger [phurba].'

One of the principal methods of working with the phurba and to actualize its essence-quality is to pierce the earth with it; sheath it; or as is common with Himalayan shamanic traditions, to penetrate it vertically, point down into a basket, bowl or cache of rice (or other soft grain if the phurba is wooden). The terms employed for the deity and the tool are interchangeable in Western scholarship. In the Himalayan shamanic tradition, the phurba may be considered as axis mundi. Müller-Ebelling, et al. affirm that for the majority of Nepalese shamans, the phurba is cognate with the world tree, either in their visualisations or in initiatory rites or other rituals.

The phurba is used as a ritual implement to signify stability on a prayer ground during ceremonies, and only those initiated in its use, or otherwise empowered, may wield it. The energy of the phurba is fierce, wrathful, piercing, affixing, transfixing. The phurba affixes the elemental process of 'space' (Sanskrit: ākāśa) to the Earth, thereby establishing an energetic continuum. Phurba, particularly those that are wooden are for shamanic healing, harmonizing and energy work and often have two nāgas (Sanskrit for snake, serpent and/or dragon, also refers to a class of supernatural entities or deities) entwined on the blade. Phurba often also bear the ashtamangala, swastika, sauwastika and/or other Himalayan, Tantric or Hindu iconography or motifs.

The phurba as an iconographical implement is also directly related to Vajrakilaya, a wrathful deity of Tibetan Buddhism who is often seen with his consort Diptacakra (Tibetan: 'khor lo rgyas 'debs ma). He is embodied in the phurba as a means of destroying (in the sense of finalising and then freeing) violence, hatred, and aggression by tying them to the blade of the phurba and then transmuting them with its tip. The pommel may be employed in blessings. It is therefore that the phurba is not a physical weapon, but a spiritual implement, and should be regarded as such.

As Müller-Ebeling, et al. state:

The magic of the Magical Dagger comes from the effect that the material object has on the realm of the spirit. The art of tantric magicians or lamas lies in their visionary ability to comprehend the spiritual energy of the material object and to willfully focus it in a determined direction. . . The tantric use of the phurba encompasses the curing of disease, exorcism, killing demons, meditation, consecrations (puja), and weather-making. The blade of the phurba is used for the destruction of demonic powers. The top end of the phurba is used by the tantrikas for blessings.

As Beer states:

The sting of the scorpion's whip-like tail transfixes and poisons its prey, and in this respect it is identified with the wrathful activity of the ritual dagger or kīla. Padmasambhava's biography relates how he received the siddhi of the kīla transmission at the great charnel ground of Rajgriha from a gigantic scorpion with nine heads, eighteen pincers and twenty-seven eyes. This scorpion reveals the kīla texts from a triangular stone box hidden beneath a rock in the cemetery. As Padmasambhava reads this terma text spontaneous understanding arises, and the heads, pincers, and eyes of the scorpion are 'revealed' as different vehicles or yanas of spiritual attainment. Here, at Rajgriha, Padmasambhava is given the title of 'the scorpion guru', and in one of his eight forms as Guru Dragpo or Pema Drago ('wrathful lotus'), he is depicted with a scorpion in his left hand. As an emblem of the wrathful kīla transmission the image of the scorpion took on a strong symbolic meaning in the early development of the Nyingma or 'ancient school' of Tibetan Buddhism.

=== Cultural context ===
To work with the spirits and deities of the earth, land and place, people of India, the Himalayas and the Mongolian Steppe pegged, nailed and/or pinned down the land. The nailing of the phurba is comparable to the idea of breaking the earth (turning the sod) in other traditions and the rite of laying the foundation stone. It is an ancient shamanic idea that has common currency throughout the region; it is prevalent in the Bön tradition and is also evident in the Vajrayana tradition. According to shamanic folklore current throughout the region, "...the mountains were giant pegs that kept the Earth in place and prevented it from moving." Mountains such as Amnye Machen, according to folklore were held to have been brought from other lands just for this purpose.

Kerrigan, et al., state that:

Prayer flags and stone pillars throughout the country also pierce the land. Even the pegs of the nomads' yak wool tents are thought of as sanctifying the ground that lies beneath.

=== Traditional lineage usage ===
In the Kathmandu Valley, the phurba is still in usage by shamans, magicians, tantrikas and lamas of different ethnic backgrounds. The phurba is used particularly intensively by the Tamang, Gurung, Bhutanese, and Newar peoples. The phurba is also employed by the Tibetans native to Nepal (the Bhotyas), the Sherpas, and the Tibetans living in Dharamasala.

Müller-Ebelling, et al., chart the difference of the traditions between the jhankris (Note: Jhankris may be understood as individuals who have a 'calling' to work with the phurba and are mostly of non-hereditary lineages of phurba workers.) and the gubajus: (Note: Gubajus may be understood as the priests, astrologers and healers amongst the Newari people of the Kathmandu Valley. Their purba traditions are of hereditary lineages which may be considered castes.)

The phurbas of the gubajus are different from those of the jhankris. As a rule, they have only one head on which there is a double vajra as shown here. Gubajus focus on the head as a mirror image of themselves in order to meditatively connect with the power of the phurba. The three or more heads of the upper area of the phurba indicate the collection of energies that the jhankris use.

A Bhairab kīla is an important healing tool of the tantric Newari gubajus. As Müller-Ebelling, et al. state:

Tantric priests (guruju) use Bhairab phurbas for the curing of disease and especially for curing children's diseases. For these cases the point of the phurba blade is dipped into a glass or a bowl of water, turned and stirred. The sick child is then given the magically charged water as medicine to drink.

Müller-Ebelling, et al. interviewed Mohan Rai, a shaman from the border area of Nepal and Bhutan and belongs to the Mongolian people of the Rai and/or Kirati. Mohan Rai is the founder of the Shamanistic Studies and Research Centre in Kathmandu, Nepal. In the interview Rai says "Without the phurba inside himself, the shaman has no consciousness...The shaman himself is the phurba; he assumes its form in order to fly into other worlds and realities"

== See also ==
- Kartika – Buddhist ceremonial flaying knife
- Kris – Weapon from Maritime Southeast Asia
- Kukri – Knife associated with the Gurkhas of Nepal
- Vajra – Spiritual weapon or symbol in Dharmic religions

== Works cited ==
- Beer, Robert (1999). The Encyclopedia of Tibetan Symbols and Motifs. Boston: Shambhala. ISBN 1-57062-416-X.
- Boord, Martin (1993). Cult of the Deity Vajrakila. Institute of Buddhist Studies. ISBN 0-9515424-3-5.
- Cantwell, Cathy; Mayer, Robert (2008). Early Tibetan Documents on Phur pa from Dunhuang. Vienna: Verlag der Österreichischen Akademie der Wissenschaften. ISBN 978-3-7001-6100-4.
- Das, Sarat Chandra (1902). Tibetan-English Dictionary with Sanskrit Synonyms. Calcutta: Bengal Secretariat Book Depot.
- Kerrigan, Michael; Bishop, Clifford; Chambers, James (1998). The Diamond Path: Tibetan and Mongolian Myth. Amsterdam: Time-Life Books. ISBN 0-7054-3563-6.
- Mayer, Robert (1996). A Scripture of the Ancient Tantra Collection: The Phur-pa bcu-gnyis. Kindsdale Publications. ISBN 1-870838-52-1.
- Müller-Ebeling, Claudia; Rätsch, Christian; Shahi, Surendra Bahadur (2002). Shamanism and Tantra in the Himalayas. Translated by Annabel Lee. Rochester, VT: Inner Traditions.
- Tsadra Foundation (2005). "phyag mtshan". Dharma Dictionary.
