= Dzi bead =

Type of stone bead

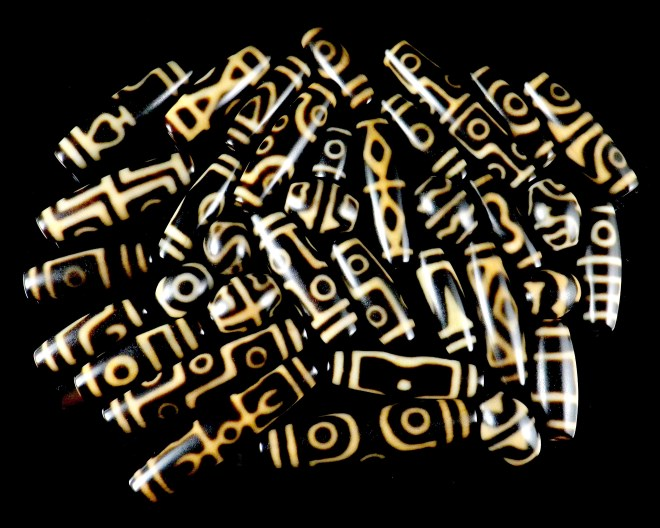
- Modern 'new' dzi beads made from etched agate

Chinese name
- Chinese: 天珠
- Hanyu Pinyin: tiānzhū
- Literal meaning: heaven beads
Transcriptions
Standard Mandarin
- Hanyu Pinyin: tiānzhū
Yue: Cantonese
- Jyutping: tin1 zyu1
Southern Min
- Hokkien POJ: thian-chu

Tibetan name
- Tibetan: གཟི
Transcriptions
- Wylie: gzi

A dzi bead (Tibetan: གཟི།; pronounced "zee"; alternative spelling: gzi) is a type of agate bead of uncertain origin found in the Himalayan regions including Tibet, Bhutan, Nepal and Ladakh.

Traditionally they are worn as part of a traditional Tibetan necklace. In traditional Tibetan necklaces, dzi beads are usually flanked with coral. Sometimes they are also worn with amber and turquoise beads.

The bead is considered to provide positive spiritual benefits to the wearer. These beads are generally prized as protective amulets and are sometimes ground and used in traditional Tibetan medicine. Beads subjected to this process shows small "dig marks" where a portion of the bead would have been scraped or ground away to be used in medicine. Some dzi beads also exhibit grinding and polishing for being used as a burnishing tool in the application of gold leaf on thangka paintings or gilded bronze statuary.

The most highly prized dzi beads are the ancient "pure dzi". The original source of these beads currently remains a mystery. While the ancient "pure dzi" beads and "Chung dzi" beads are greatly valued, new modern-made dzi beads are also gaining popularity among Tibetans as an affordable and more easily obtainable alternative.

== Names ==
The meaning of the Tibetan word "dzi" [གཟི།] translates to "shine, brightness, clearness, splendor". In mainland China and Taiwan they are widely known by the name "天珠, tīan zhū", which is given by Taiwanese collectors and means "heaven's bead" in Mandarin Chinese.

== Design ==
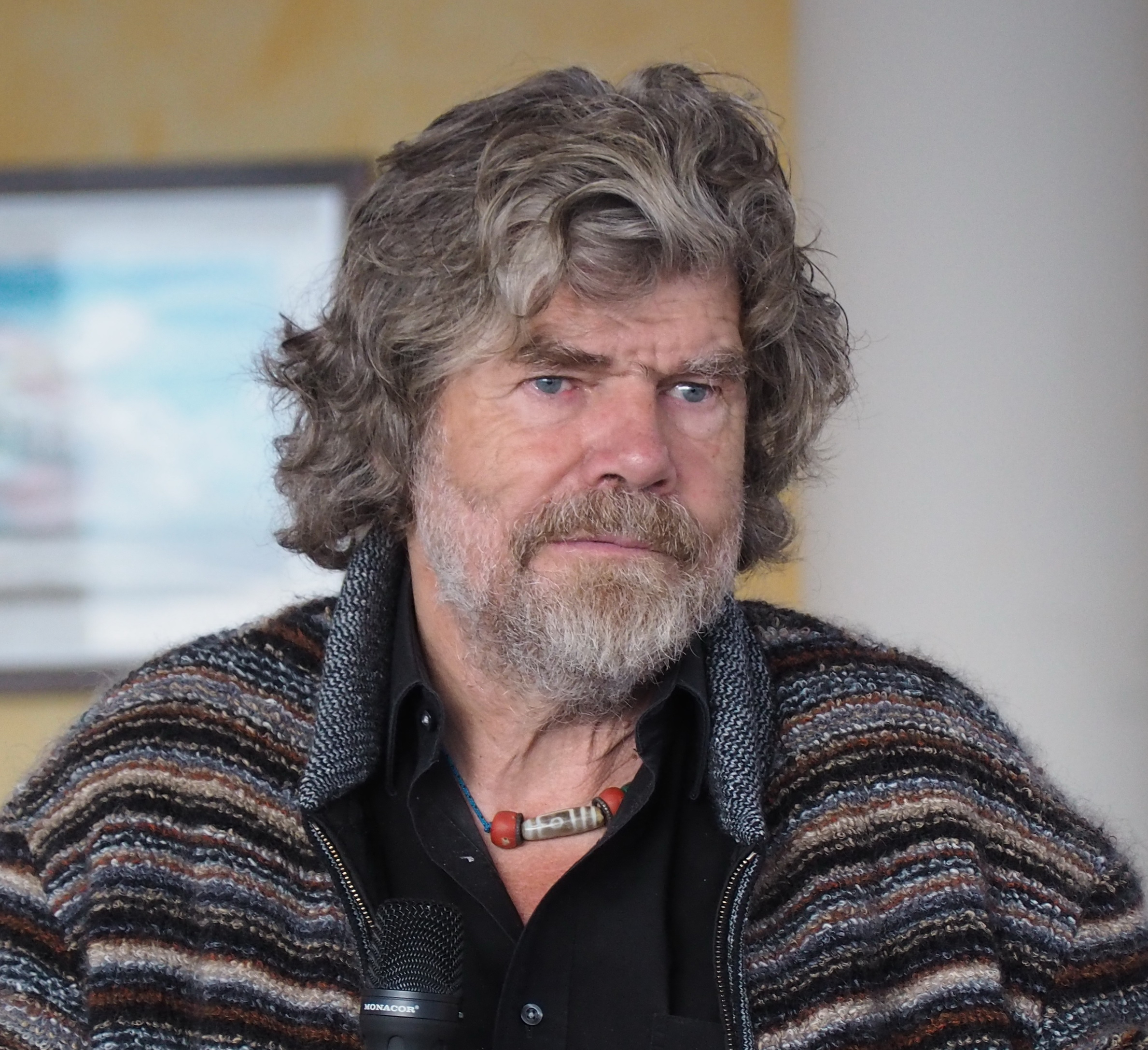
Tyrollean mountaineer Reinhold Messner wearing a dzi amulet

Dzi beads are made from agate, and may have decorative symbols composed of circles, ovals, squares, waves or zig zags, stripes, lines, diamonds, dots, and various other archetypal and symbolic patterns.

Colors mainly range from brown to black, with the pattern usually in ivory white. Dzi beads can appear in different colours, shapes, and sizes; the surface is usually smooth and waxy, presumably resulting from wear over a long period of time.

Sometimes the natural patterns (usually "layered" swirls) of the agate can be seen underneath or behind the decorative symbols and designs.

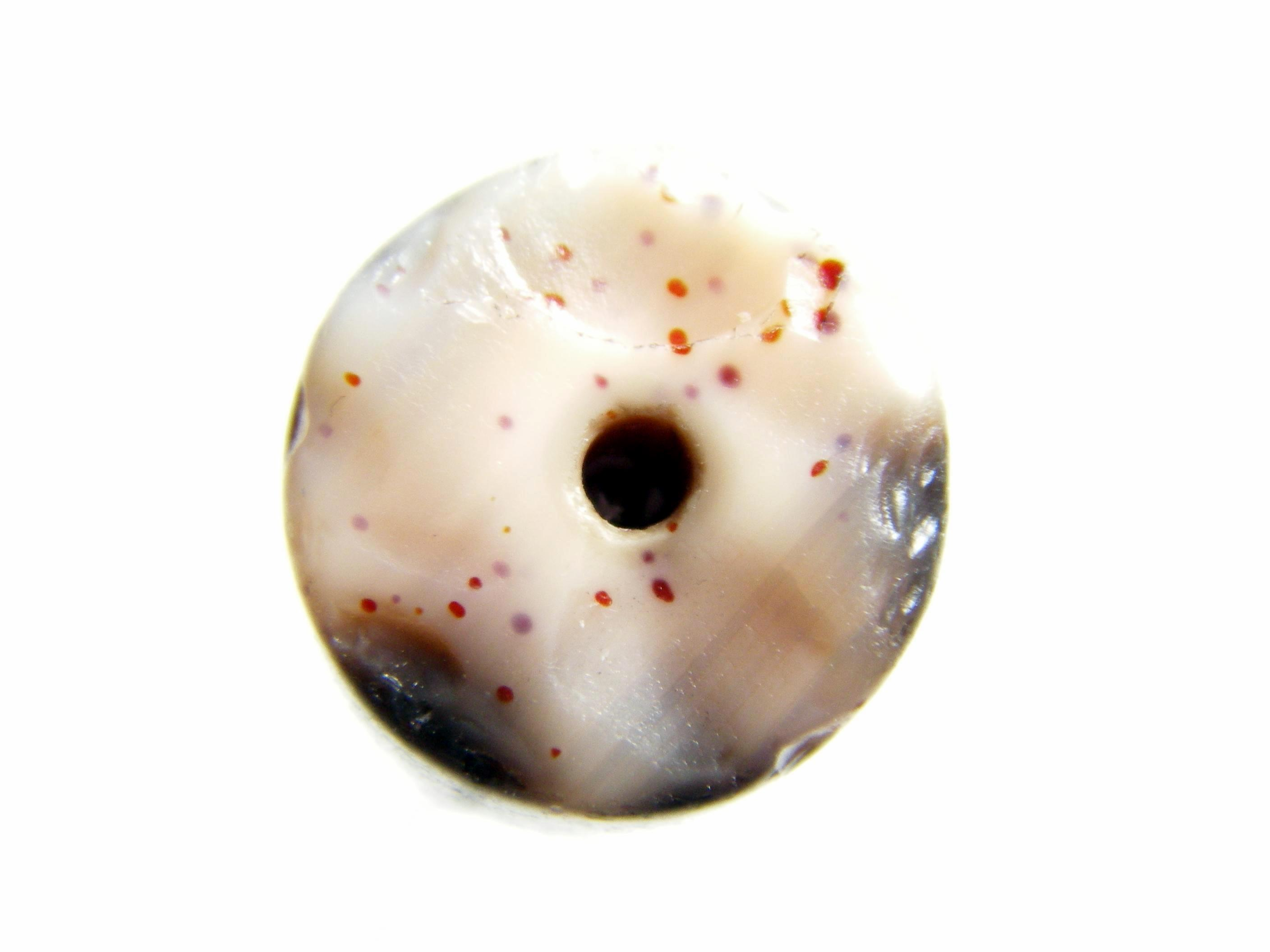
Cinnabar dots as seen on an ancient dzi.

Some dzi beads exhibit what are referred to as "blood spots", which are tiny red dots in the white areas, indicative of iron content. This is a highly desirable characteristic among collectors, but relatively rare. Another desirable effect is "Nāga skin", in which the surface of the bead exhibits tiny circular weathering marks that resemble scales. Sometimes natural banded agate beads without any artificial etchings are also viewed as a type of dzi by Tibetans.

The number of "eyes", or circular designs on the stone, is considered significant when considering the importance of a dzi. The symbolic meaning of dzi beads are sometimes based on the number and arrangement of the dots.

== Origins ==
Dzi stones made their first appearance between 2000 and 1000 BC, in ancient India; a few hundred thousand were supposedly brought back by Tibetan soldiers from Persia during a raid. The malicious effect of the "evil eye" was taken very seriously by these people, and dzi were thought to counteract the evil eye. The artisans who made the dzi created amulets with "eyes" on them as a "fight fire with fire" form of protection. Artisans used agate as the base stone, and then embellished the beads' lines and shapes using ancient methods that remain mysterious. Treatments may have included darkening with plant sugars and heat, bleaching and white line etching with natron, and protecting certain areas with grease, clay, wax, or a similar substance. A hole was drilled before the bead was decorated, as drilling caused most breakage during the production process, and holes were also useful for stringing and dipping numerous beads as a step in coloration. The earliest holes were conical and done with solid drill bits drilling from both ends in an attempt to meet near the center of the bead. Very small drill tips of chipped flint were used without abrasives and numerous other materials, regardless of hardness, when used with abrasives. Neolithic era beads were also drilled with hollow, tubular abrasion driven bits of reed and, later, during the Chalcolithic, copper. These drilled a hole with a core of agate inside the tubular drill. Tubular bit holes were parallel walled rather than conical, but also done from both ends. Both methods required arduous work done with a bow drill, with time and effort being determined by hardness of abrasive, from ground sand (quartz) to corundum.

Although the geographic origin of dzi beads is uncertain, it is accepted that they are now called "Tibetan beads", just like "Tibetan coral", which also came to Tibet from elsewhere. Tibetans cherish these beads and consider them hereditary gems. In this way they have survived thousands of years, being worn by hundreds of individual people. Dzi are found primarily in Tibet, but also in neighbouring Bhutan, Nepal, Ladakh and Sikkim. Although dzi type agate beads were made in the Indus Valley during the Harappan period and at various locations rich in agate deposits in India, such as in Khambhat, since their Neolithic periods, the earliest archaeologically controlled find of an agate bead with dzi style decoration of straight and curved lines and circular eye found has been from a Saka culture excavation (Uigarak) in Kazakhstan, dated 7th – 5th century BCE. These were said to be imports from India, reflecting long-distance trade with the more nomadic Saka or Scythian tribes.

Sometimes shepherds and farmers find dzi beads in the soil or in the grasslands. Because of this, some Tibetans traditionally believe or believed that dzi are naturally formed, not man-made.

Since knowledge of the bead is derived from several differing oral traditions, the beads have provoked controversy regarding their source, their method of manufacture and even their precise definition. In Tibetan culture these beads are believed to attract local protectors, dharmapalas or deities or maybe beneficial ghosts, ancestors or even bodhisattvas. Because of this, dzi beads are always treated with respect.

== New dzi ==
It has been reported that modern era dzi style beads were made in Idar Oberstein, Germany at least as early as the 19th century. The German agate-cutters at Idar-Oberstein plied their trade since the Roman Period. They brought the coloring of agates to a science and the cutting and drilling to the mechanical level of perfection for which Germans are known.

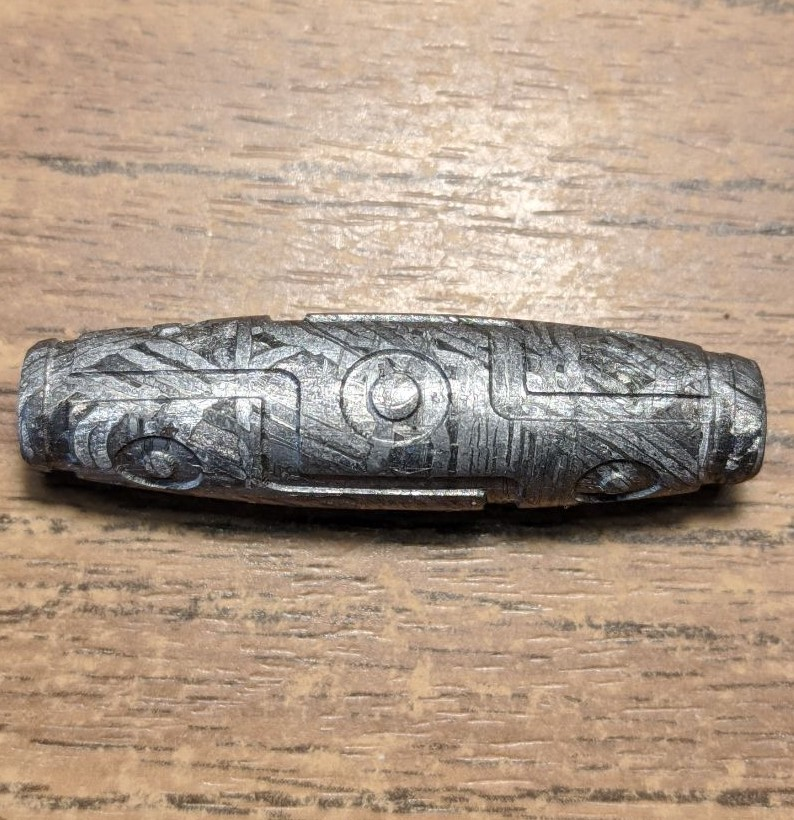
Meteorite dzi bead "9 eyes" carved from Aletai iron meteorite

Dzi are made from agate, and cutting, drilling and decorating a bead can take many days. Modern methods use lasers, sugars, chemicals and vacuum chambers.

With a few exceptions, new beads are not considered to have the mystic associations of the ancient beads, but it is considered possible to give new dzi similar powers with some time and effort: 1) by taking them to be blessed by a lama or guru; 2) taking them on pilgrimages to holy places such as stupas and shrines; and 3) reciting mantras, as well as taking religious vows with them. An advantage of new dzi beads is that they do not carry any of the bad karma of previous owners. It is considered possible to rid a stone of bad energy by submerging it in saltwater for several hours, and then fanning incense over it. The dzi should be treated with respect from that time on. Sun basking and herbal smudging are also said to purify the beads. Spirit aroma offering and recitation of Cintamani dharani are considered helpful in charging the bead as well.

== Imitation dzi ==
Imitation dzi are created from materials other than agate or chalcedony. They can be made of glass, resin, lampwork, wood, bone, plastic, metal, or non-traditional etched stones. Imitation dzi have a long history, some dating back a couple of hundred years. The older mock dzi have some collectible value. Some of the resin mock dzi have a filling of lead to add weight.

Some people would also call the modern machine-carved and machine-drilled, highly polished new dzi "mock dzi". Almost invariably mass-produced, these are available for less than two dollars, and are often sold by the strand. The etching on these cheap beads has been done very quickly, and the decorations do not penetrate into the inner core of the bead. These are usually targeted for sale to mainland Chinese customers as lucky feng shui charms.

== Value ==
Market value for ancient beads can easily reach into hundreds of thousands of US dollars – especially for beads with more "eyes". Tiny red spots, known as bloodspots, caused by iron inclusion in the agate also increase the value. New dzi prices range from about ten to two thousand US dollars, depending on quality and luster. There are many factors that contribute to the value of a dzi bead. These factors include (but are not limited to) the motif, bead material, quality of the bead material, craftsmanship, age, rarity, and condition.

== Similar beads ==
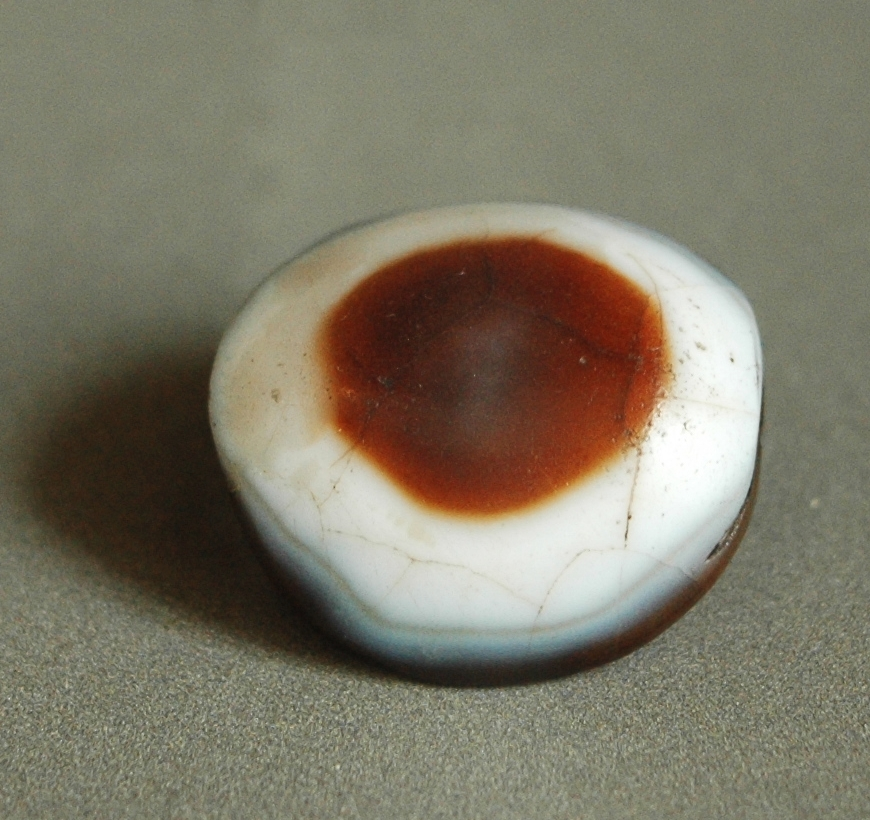
An ancient goat eye bead inscribed with the name of Larsa ruler Warad-Sin. This ancient Mesopotamian bead is very similar to the Luk Mik beads used by Tibetans. Beads like these are also found in Afghanistan and Bactria.

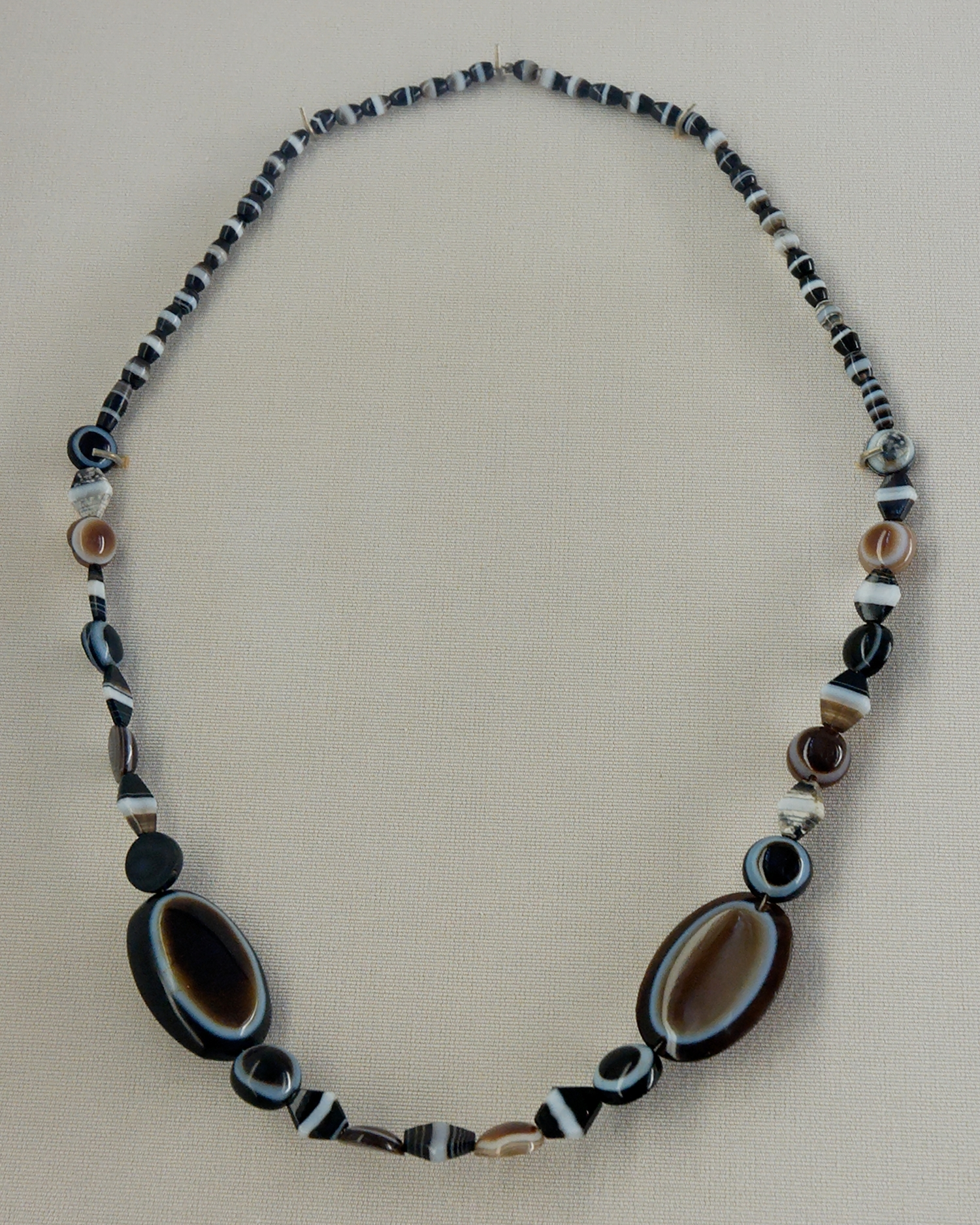
Luk Mik-style and other striped agate beads strung together. Susa, western Iran, dating back to 300 BC. Many of these beads were recovered in Taxila and southern Mesopotamia.

Similar to dzi beads are the so-called chung dzi, which have been imported to Tibet since ancient times. These can be plain, naturally banded agate beads, or etched beads (often with black and white striped patterns). Some are carnelians or black agate with thin white etching patterns resembling the back of a turtle, which is an ancient pattern that dates back to the era of the Harappan Indus culture. Ancient Roman agate beads as well as etched Bactrian, Middle Eastern, Chinese, Afghan, Yemeni, and Indian agate and carnelian beads made their way into Tibet. All these are considered chung dzi (in Tibetan, "chung" means ordinary or common). Chung dzi are believed to have similar properties to real "eyed" dzi; they are less valuable, but they are highly prized by Tibetans and also considered a variety of dzi.

Another similar type of bead is called Luk Mik ("goat's eye") – it is a naturally formed "one-eyed" coin-shaped agate (pictured). Luk Mik are the preferred dzi for travelling in Tibet.

The antique Pyu and Phumtek beads of Burma are also similar in some ways to dzi: they share some of the dzi bead patterns, but instead of agate, the Phumtek are generally made from petrified opalized palm wood, while Pyu beads are often made of red or orange carnelian with some thin white alkali-etched lines.

== See also ==
- Aqeeq
- Evil Eye
- Hamsa
- Nazar (amulet)
- Thogchag
- Etched carnelian beads
