= Orichalcum =

Mythological metal

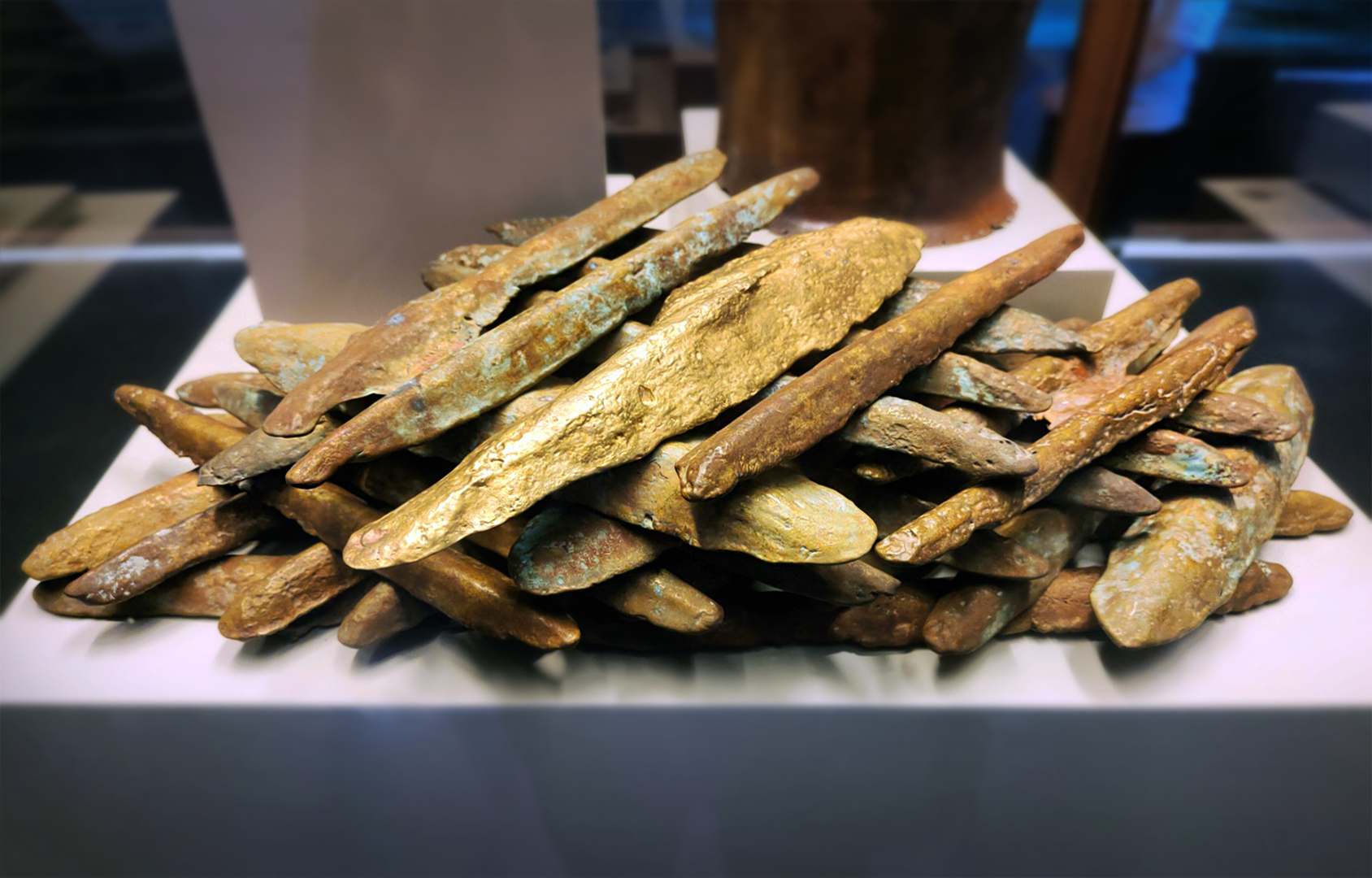
- Orichalcum found in Gela, Sicily
- Material type: Metal

Orichalcum (or aurichalcum) /ˌɔːrɪˈkælkəm/ or orichalc /ˌɔːrɪˈkælk/ is a metal mentioned in several ancient writings, including the story of Atlantis in the Critias of Plato. Within the dialogue, Critias (460–403 BC) says that orichalcum had been considered second only to gold in value and had been found and mined in many parts of Atlantis in ancient times, but that by Critias's own time, orichalcum was known only by name.

Orichalcum may have been used in reference to a specific noble metal, such as platinum, as it was supposed to be mined, but has been identified as pure copper or certain alloys of bronze, and especially brass alloys in the case of antique Roman coins, the latter being of "similar appearance to modern brass" according to scientific research.

== Overview ==
The English word orichalcum derives from Greek ὀρείχαλκος, oreikhalkos (from ὄρος, oros, mountain and χαλκός, chalkos, copper), literally meaning "mountain copper".

Orichalcum has been vaguely identified by ancient Greek authors to be either a gold–copper alloy—akin to rose gold, a form of pure copper, or a copper ore or various chemicals based on copper, but also copper–tin and copper–zinc alloys, or a metal or metallic alloy supposedly no longer known.

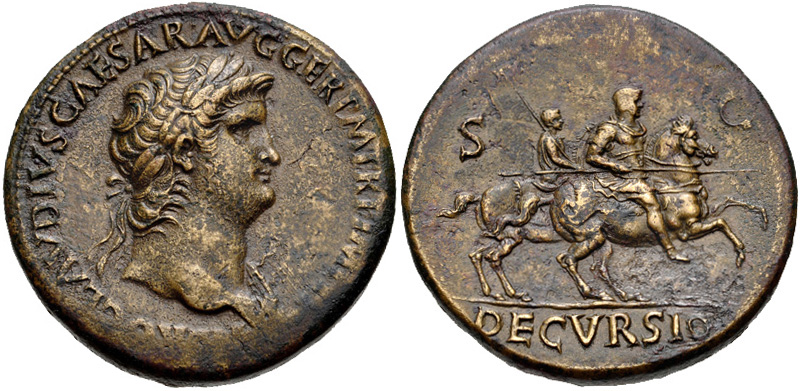
An orichalcum sestertius issued under Nero, perhaps depicting the equestrian Troy Game, a kind of cavalry parade (decursio)

The Romans, in transliterating ὀρείχαλκος as orichalcum or alternatively as aurichalcum, took it to mean "gold copper", deriving the root or- from aurum, "gold," rather than the Greek oros, mountain. The comic playwright Plautus makes a few unclear jokes about orichalcum that were once interpreted to mean that the metal was regarded as something like "fool's gold" but may simply be about its value relative to gold. A mention by Cicero indicates that the metal they called orichalcum resembled gold in color but had a lower value. In Virgil's Aeneid, the breastplate of Turnus is described as "stiff with gold and white orichalc" (auro squalentem alboque orichalco, 12.87). Nero issued sestertii made of "orichalcum" that were brass, made of four parts copper to one part zinc. Pliny seems to have believed orichalcum was a naturally occurring ore, not an alloy.

In later years, "orichalcum" was used to describe the sulfide mineral chalcopyrite and also brass. These usages are difficult to reconcile with the claims of Plato's Critias, who states that the metal was "only a name" by his time, while brass and chalcopyrite were very important in the time of Plato, as they still are today.

Joseph Needham notes that Bishop Richard Watson, an 18th-century professor of chemistry, wrote of an ancient idea that there were "two sorts of brass or orichalcum". Needham also suggests that the Greeks may not have known how orichalcum was made and that they might even have had an imitation of the original.

== Discovery of brass ingots ==
In 2015, 39 metal ingots were discovered in a sunken vessel on the coast of Gela in Sicily which have tentatively been dated at 2,600 years old. They were analyzed with X-ray fluorescence and found to be an alloy consisting of 75–80% copper, 15–20% zinc, and smaller percentages of nickel, lead, and iron. Researchers have referred to the metal as "orichalcum" on the basis of its composition. Another cache of 47 ingots was recovered in February 2016 and found to have similar composition as measured with ICP-OES and ICP-MS: around 65–80% copper, 15–25% zinc, 4–7% lead, 0.5–1% nickel, and trace amounts of silver, antimony, arsenic, bismuth, and other elements.

This composition corresponds to high quality brass.

== In ancient literature ==
Orichalcum is first mentioned in the 7th century BC by Hesiod, and in the Homeric hymn dedicated to Aphrodite, dated to the 630s BC.

According to the Critias of Plato, the inner wall surrounding the citadel of Atlantis with the Temple of Poseidon "flashed with the red light of orichalcum". The interior walls, pillars, and floors of the temple were completely covered in orichalcum, and the roof was variegated with gold, silver, and orichalcum. In the center of the temple stood a pillar of orichalcum, on which the laws of Poseidon and records of the first son princes of Poseidon were inscribed.

Pliny the Elder points out that orichalcum had lost currency due to the mines being exhausted. Pseudo-Aristotle in De mirabilibus auscultationibus (62) describes a type of copper that is "very shiny and white, not because there is tin mixed with it, but because some earth is combined and molten with it." This might be a reference to orichalcum obtained during the smelting of copper with the addition of "cadmia", a kind of earth formerly found on the shores of the Black Sea, which is attributed to be zinc oxide.

== Numismatics ==
In numismatics, the term "orichalcum" is used to refer exclusively to a type of brass alloy used for minting Roman as, sestertius, dupondius, and semis coins. It is considered more valuable than copper, of which the as coin was previously made.

== In media ==
- Orichalc was an Atlantean resource in the city builder computer game Poseidon: Master of Atlantis.
- Orichalcum is mentioned in the tabletop role-playing game Dungeons & Dragons as the "ultimate metal" that metallurgical alchemists strive to discover or create. Orichalcum is said to be yellow, light as air, and so strong that it cannot be bent or scratched.

== See also ==
- Ashtadhatu
- Auricupride
- Corinthian bronze
- Electrum
- Hepatizon
- Panchaloha
- Shakudō
- Shibuichi
- Thokcha
- Tumbaga
