= Corinthian bronze =

Highly valuable metal alloy in classical antiquity

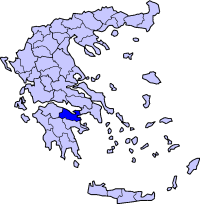
Corinth's location on a map of modern Greece

Corinthian bronze, also named Corinthian brass or aes Corinthiacum, was a metal alloy in classical antiquity. It is thought to be an alloy of copper with gold or silver (or both), although it has also been contended that it was simply a very high grade of bronze, or a kind of bronze that was manufactured in Corinth. It is referred to in various ancient texts, but no certain examples of Corinthian bronze exist today. However, it has been increasingly suggested that a number of artefacts previously described as niello in fact use a technique of patinated metal that may be the same as Corinthian bronze and is similar to the Japanese shakudō.

Its composition was long a mystery, but contemporary thinking is that Corinthian bronze was "a patinated alloy of copper with some gold and silver", perhaps the same as the hesmen kem or "black copper" of Ancient Egyptian art. This is shown by ancient texts to be a prestigious material, and apparently survives in a number of statuettes of "distinctive black-patinated, inlaid metal", of which scientific analysis shows "that some have a highly unusual composition containing small amounts of gold, silver and arsenic in the alloy", and are broadly similar to shakudō.

== Classical antiquity ==
Of the known types of bronze or brass, not distinguished in classical antiquity and interchangeably known in Latin as aes and in Greek as χαλκός, Corinthian bronze was the most valuable. Statues, vases and vessels, or other objects formed of this metal were priceless, of greater value than if they had been made of silver or gold. Pliny the Elder distinguished it into three kinds, depending on the metal that is added to the copper base: in the first, gold is added (luteum); in the second, silver (candidum); in the third, gold, silver, and copper are equally blended. Plutarch and Cicero both comment that Corinthian bronze, unlike many other copper alloys, is resistant to tarnishing. Pliny also refers to a fourth, dark alloy, known as hepatizon. Petronius and other authors mocked the connoisseurs of their day who claimed to be able to identify it.

According to legend, Corinthian bronze was first created by accident, during the burning of Corinth by Lucius Mummius Achaicus in 146 BC, when the city's immense quantities of gold, silver, and copper melted together. Pliny however, remarked that this story is unbelievable, because most of the creators of the highly valued works in Corinthian bronze in Ancient Greece lived at a much earlier period than second century BC. According to Pliny, the method of making it had been lost for a long time, although some sources describe the process by which it is created, involving heat treatment, quenching, leaching, and burnishing, in a process similar to depletion gilding. The lost ability to give an object made from bronze the appearance of gold or silver may be one strand behind the later alchemical quest to turn base metals into precious metals.

== Outside classical antiquity ==
Articles made of Corinthian bronze are mentioned in the Bible. The Beautiful Gate (or Nicanor Gate) of the Second Temple in Jerusalem, mentioned in the Book of Acts 3:2–10, was a large, 18 metre (60 feet) wide structure said to be either solid, or covered in plates of, Corinthian brass. Another Biblical reference, in Book of Ezra 8:27, is usually translated "fine copper [or bronze], precious as gold".

Similar alloys are found outside Europe. An alloy of gold and copper, known as tumbaga was in widespread use in Pre-columbian Mesoamerica, and has an essentially identical composition to Corinthian brass. A similar metallurgical process for "the colouration [chrôsis] of gold" is described in the 15th recipe in the Leyden papyrus X, from Thebes, Egypt, dated to the 4th century AD.

== Quotations ==
I think it may be of Corinthian brass
Which was a mixture of all metals, but
The brazen uppermost.

— Byron, Don Juan, vi. 56.

Man is the most composite of all creatures. ... Well, as in the old burning of the Temple at Corinth, by the melting and intermixture of silver and gold and other metals a new compound more precious than any, called Corinthian brass, was formed; so in this continent — asylum of all nations — the energy of Irish, Germans, Swedes, Poles, and Cossacks, and all the European tribes, of the Africans, and of the Polynesians, will construct a new race, a new religion, a new state, a new literature, which will be as vigorous as the new Europe which came out of the smelting-pot of the Dark Ages, or that which earlier emerged from the Pelasgic and Etruscan barbarism.

— Ralph Waldo Emerson, describing American Culture as a melting pot in a journal entry, 1845

== See also ==
- Electrum – alloy of gold and silver, often with trace amounts of copper
- Hepatizon – a similar bronze alloy with a dark patina, also known in classical antiquity and sometimes identified as a sub-type of Corinthian bronze
- Orichalcum – another metal mentioned in ancient texts, later used to refer to brass
- Panchaloha – alloy of gold, silver, copper, zinc, and iron with Hindu religious significance
- Thokcha, also known as "thunderbolt iron" – Tibetan amulets made from meteoric iron
- Tumbaga – pre-Columbian American alloy of copper and gold
- Shakudō – Japanese billon of gold and copper with a dark blue-purple patina
- Shibuichi – Japanese copper–silver alloy, often with gold
