= Panchaloha =

Term for traditional five-metal alloys used for Hindu artifacts

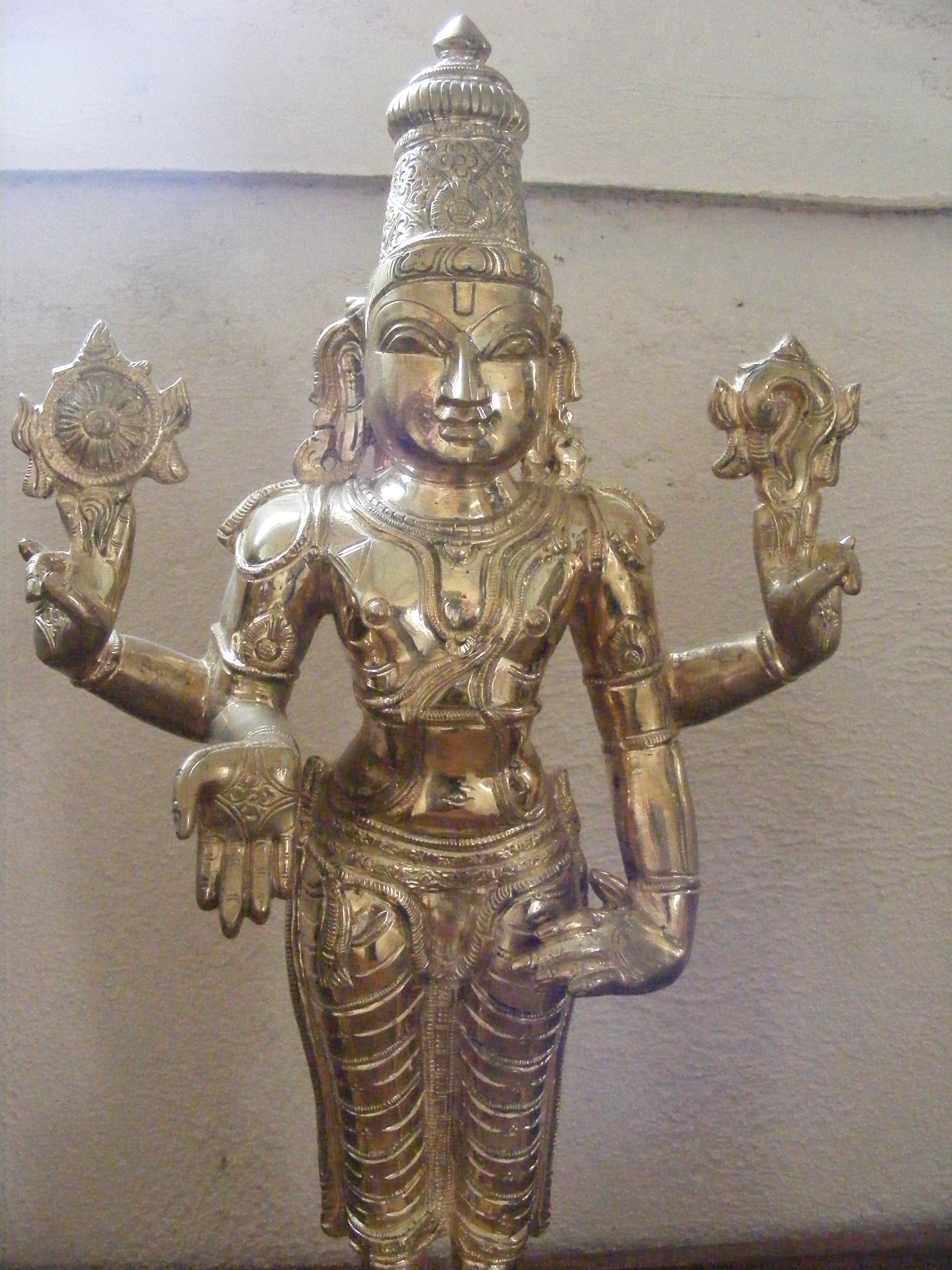
A murti statuette of Vishnu made from Panchaloha

Panchaloha (Sanskrit: पञ्चलोह), also called Pañcadhātu (Sanskrit: पञ्चधातु, lit. 'five metals'), is a term for traditional five-metal alloys of sacred significance, used for making Hindu temple murti and jewellery.

== Composition ==
The composition is laid down in the Shilpa shastras, a collection of ancient texts that describe arts, crafts, and their design rules, principles and standards. Panchaloha is traditionally described as an alloy of gold, silver, copper, zinc, and iron. It is believed that wearing jewellery made of such an alloy brings balance in life, self-confidence, good health, fortune, prosperity, and peace of mind.

In Tibetan culture, it was considered auspicious to use thokcha (meteoric iron) either as a component of the alloy in general or for a specific object or purpose. The amount used could vary, depending upon the material's availability and suitability, among other considerations. A small, largely symbolic quantity of "sky-iron" might be added, or it might be included as a significant part of the alloy-recipe.

== See also ==
Media related to Panchaloha at Wikimedia Commons

- Ashtadhatu – Alloy of eight metals in Hindu and Jain iconography
- High-entropy alloys – Alloys with high proportions of several metals
- Bronze – Alloy of copper and tin
- Brass – Alloy of copper and zinc
- Orichalcum – Fabulous metal mentioned in ancient writings, such as the story of Atlantis in the Critias of Plato
- Corinthian bronze – Highly valuable metal alloy in classical antiquity
- Hepatizon – Alloy also known as Black Corinthian Bronze
- Electrum – Alloy of gold and silver
- Tumbaga – Alloy of gold and copper used in pre-Columbian Mesoamerica
- Shakudō – Japanese copper and gold alloy
- Shibuichi – Historically Japanese copper alloy
- Thokcha – Tibetan meteoric iron
