= Hepatizon =

Alloy also known as Black Corinthian Bronze

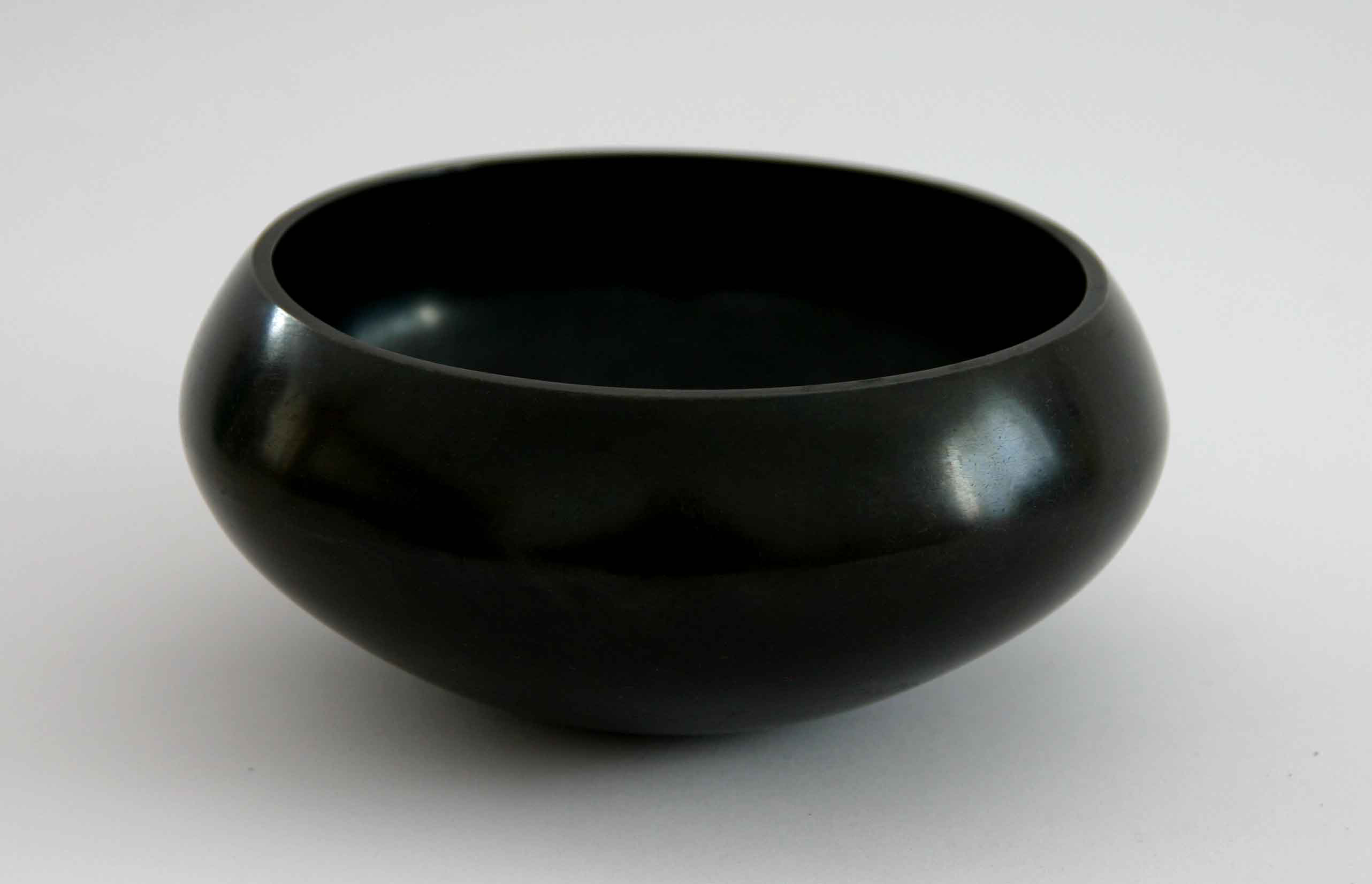
Bowl made of Corinthium Bronze

Hepatizon (Greek etymology: ἧπαρ, English translation: "liver"), also known as black Corinthian bronze, was a highly valuable metal alloy in classical antiquity. It is thought to be an alloy of copper with the addition of a small proportion of gold and silver (perhaps as little as 8% of each), mixed and treated to produce a material with a dark purplish patina, similar to the colour of liver. It is referred to in various ancient texts, but few known examples of hepatizon exist today.

Of the known types of bronze or brass in classical antiquity (known in Latin as aes and in Greek as χαλκός), hepatizon was the second most valuable. Pliny the Elder mentions it in his Natural History, stating that it is less valuable than Corinthian bronze, which contained a greater proportion of gold or silver and as a result resembled the precious metals, but was esteemed before bronze from Delos and Aegina. As a result of its dark colour, it was particularly valued for statues. According to Pliny, the method of making it, like that for Corinthian bronze, had been lost for a long time.

Similar alloys are found outside Europe. For example, shakudō is a Japanese billon of gold and copper with a characteristic dark blue-purple patina.

== See also ==
=== Metallurgy ===
- Bronze – Alloy of copper and tin
- Brass – Alloy of copper and zinc
- Orichalcum – Mythological metal
- Corinthian bronze – Highly valuable metal alloy in classical antiquity
- Panchaloha – Term for traditional five-metal alloys used for Hindu artifacts
- Electrum – Alloy of gold and silver
- Tumbaga – Alloy of gold and copper used in pre-Columbian Mesoamerica
- Shakudō – Japanese copper and gold alloy
- Shibuichi – Historically Japanese copper alloy
- Thokcha – Tibetan meteoric iron

== Sources ==
- New Scientist, 22 January 1994, "Secret of Achilles' Shield"
