= Tumbaga =

Alloy of gold and copper used in pre-Columbian Mesoamerica

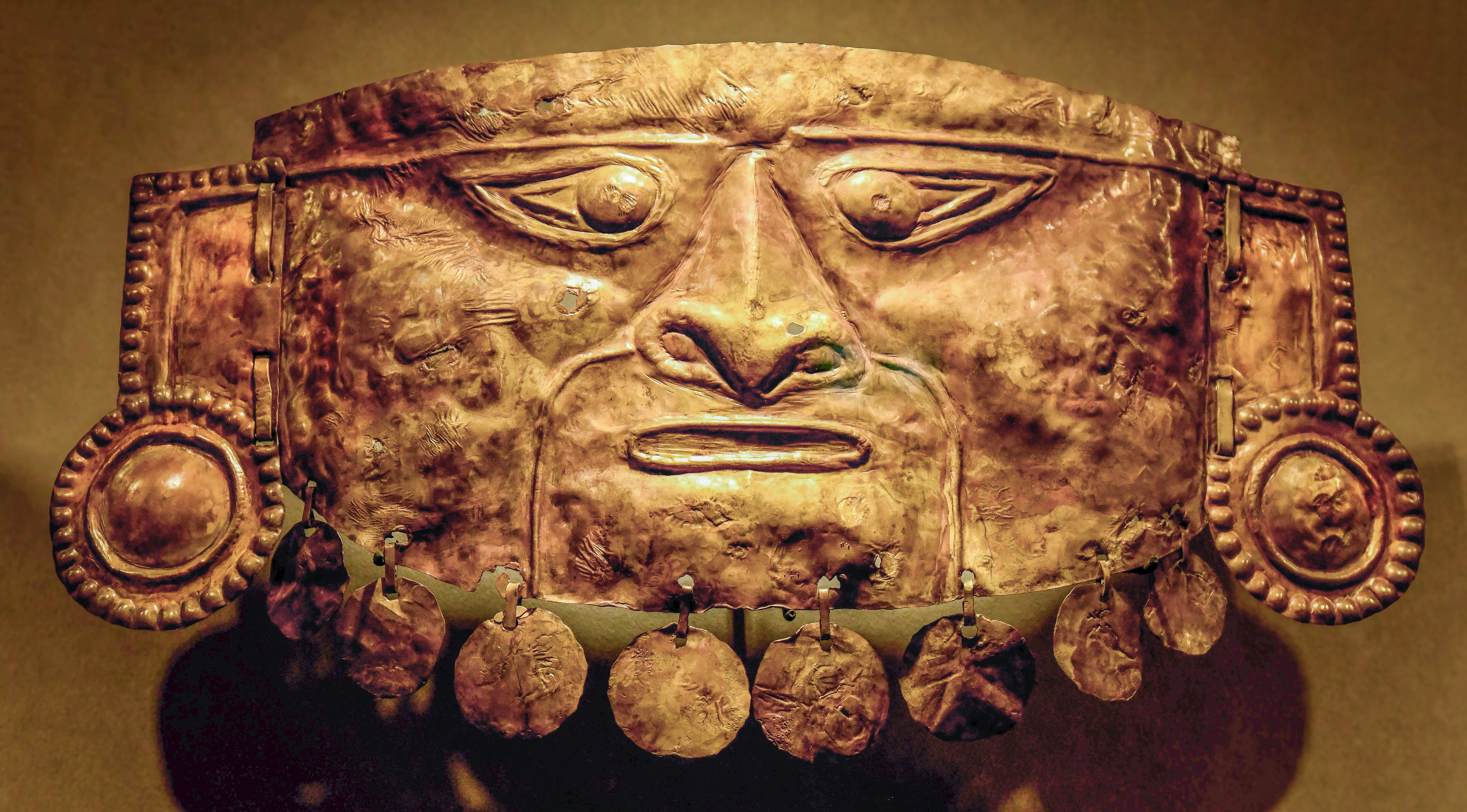
Funeral mask in Tumbaga - Lambayeque culture Musée des Amériques

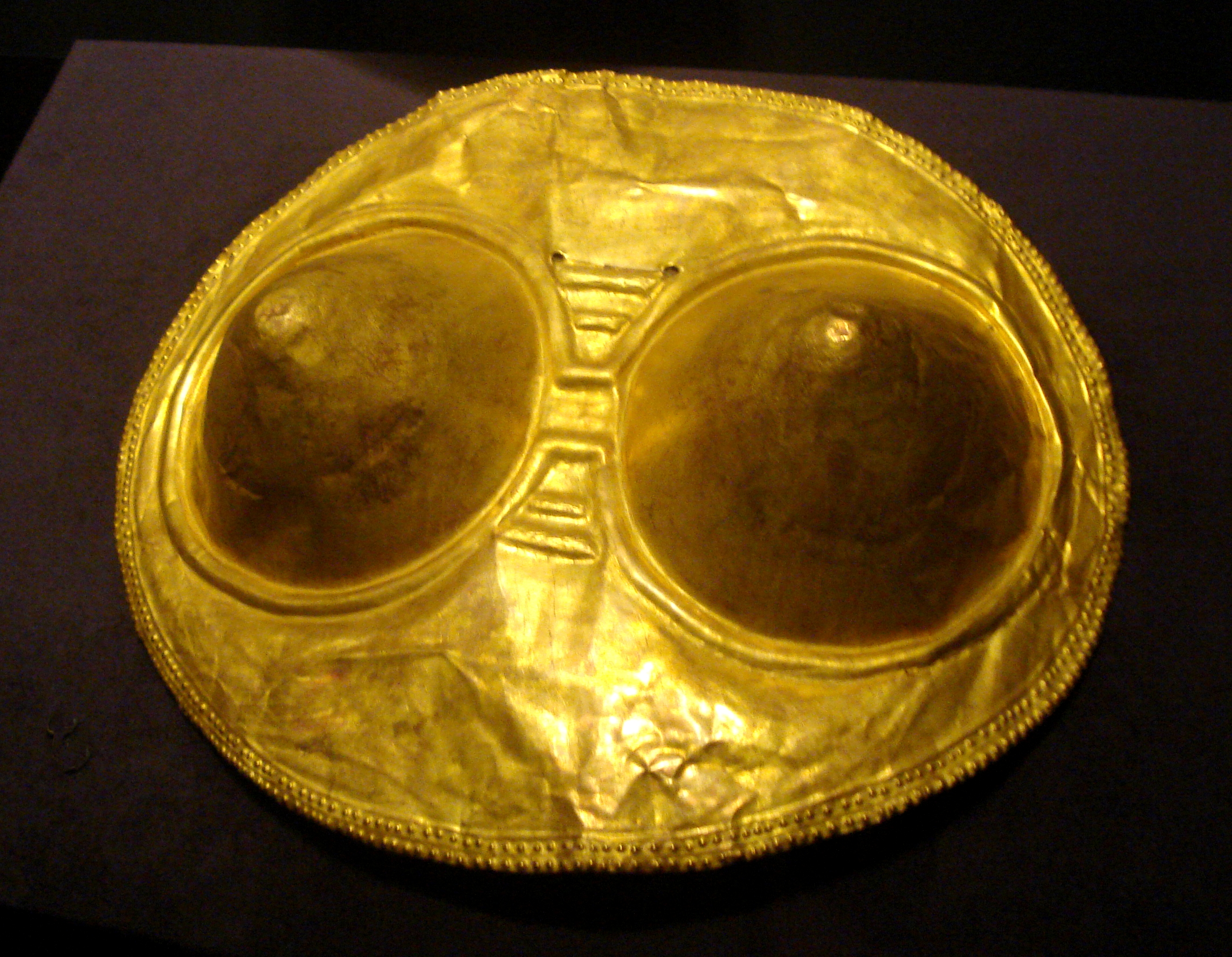
A tumbaga pectoral girdle of the Quimbaya culture; 300–1600 AD

Tumbaga is the name given by Spanish Conquistadors for a non-specific alloy of gold and copper, and metals composed of these elements. Pieces made of tumbaga were widely found in pre-Hispanic Mesoamerica and the Philippines, South America, and Southeast Asia.

The term is a borrowing from the Tagalog tumbaga. This came from Malay tembaga, meaning 'copper' or 'brass'. It has also been spelled tumbago in literature.

== Composition and properties ==
Tumbaga is an alloy composed mostly of gold and copper. It has a significantly lower melting point than gold or copper alone. It is harder than copper, but maintains malleability after being pounded.

Tumbaga can be treated with a carboxylic acid, such as oxalic acid, to dissolve copper off the surface. What remains is a shiny layer of nearly pure gold on top of a harder, more durable copper-gold alloy sheet. This process is referred to as depletion gilding.

== Use and function ==
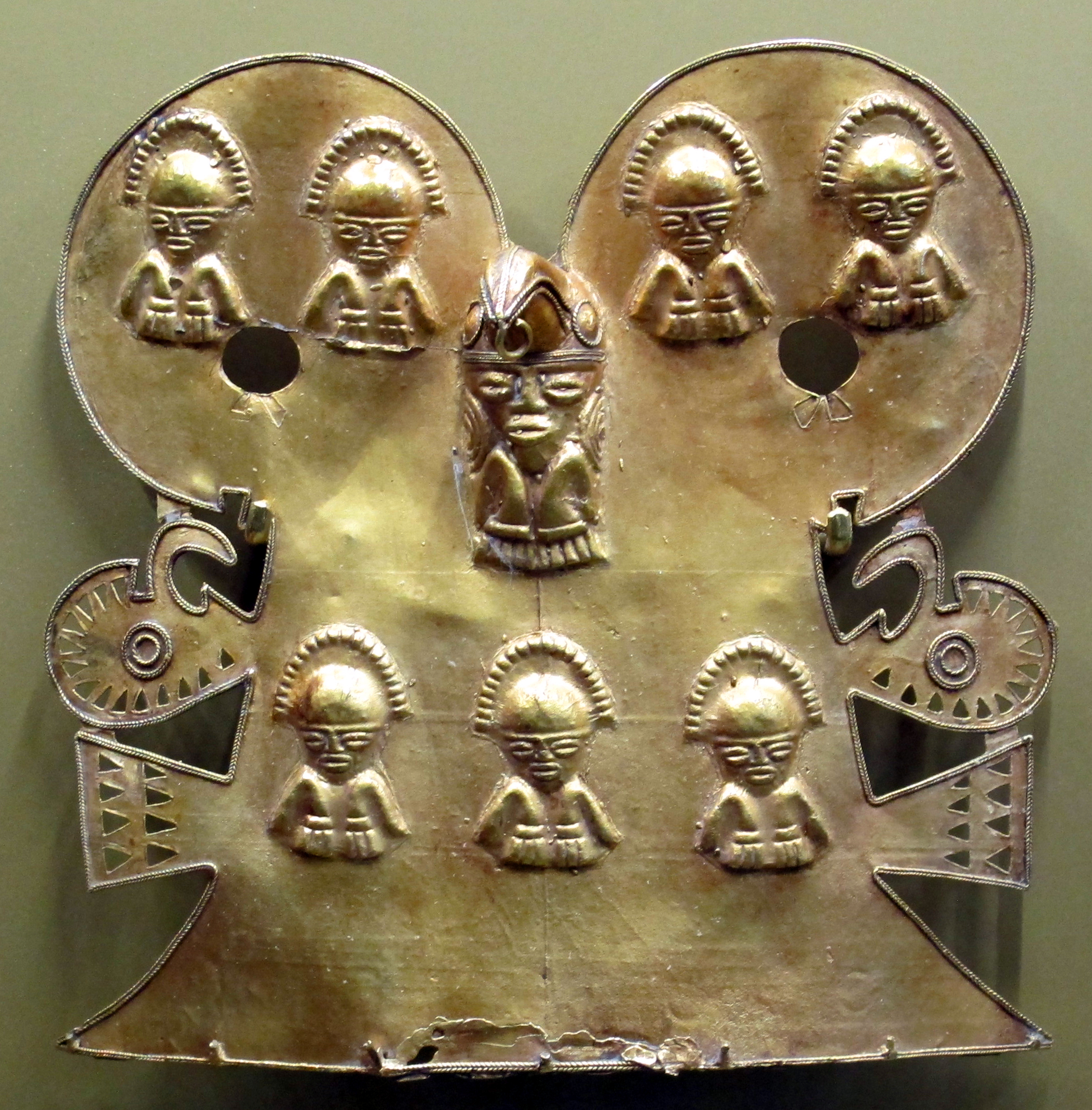
Colombia, tumbaga pectoral, Muisca culture, 600-1600 AD

Tumbaga was widely used by the pre-Columbian cultures of Central and South America to make religious objects, as they considered gold a sacred metal. Like most gold alloys, tumbaga was versatile and could be cast, drawn, hammered, gilded, soldered, welded, plated, hardened, annealed, polished, engraved, embossed, and inlaid.

The proportion of gold to copper in artifacts varies widely; some items have been found with as much as 97% gold while others contain 97% copper. Some tumbaga has also been found to be composed of metals besides gold and copper, up to 18% of the total mass of the tumbaga.

Tumbaga objects were often made using a combination of the lost wax technique and depletion gilding. An alloy of varying proportions of copper, silver, and gold (typically in a percentage ratio of 80:15:5) was cast. It was burned after removal, turning surface copper into copper oxide, which was mechanically removed. The object was placed in an oxidizing solution, likely composed of sodium chloride (salt) and ferric sulfate. This dissolved the silver from the surface, leaving only gold. When viewed through a microscope, voids appear where the copper and silver had been.

== The "Tumbaga" Wreck ==
In 1992, approximately 200 silver "tumbaga" bars were recovered in wreckage off Grand Bahama Island. They were composed mainly of silver, copper, and gold plundered by the Spaniards during the conquests of Cortés and hastily melted into bars of tumbaga for transport across the Atlantic. Such bars were typically melted back into their constituent metals in Spain.

== See also ==
- Guanín – Pre-Columbian central American alloy
- Tombac – Copper-zinc alloy
- Orichalcum – Mythological metal
- Corinthian bronze – Highly valuable metal alloy in classical antiquity
- Hepatizon – Alloy also known as Black Corinthian Bronze
- Electrum – Alloy of gold and silver
