= Thokcha =

Tibetan meteoric iron

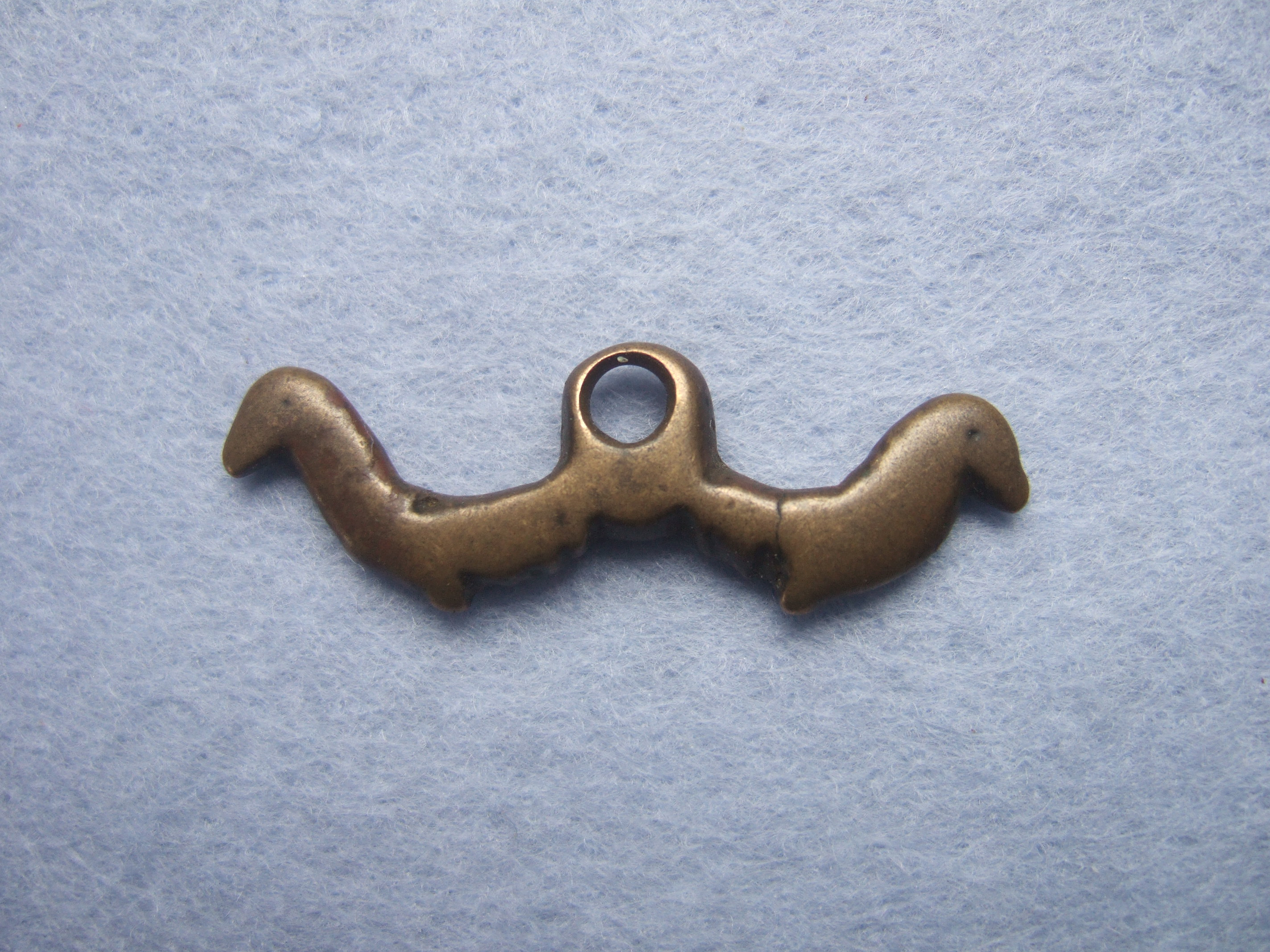
Tibetan thokcha in the shape of a small arch. It may originally have been a tool used to open knots in leather straps that secured pack animal loads.

Thokcha (Tibetan: ཐོག་ལྕགས, Wylie: thog lcags; also alternatively Tibetan: གནམ་ལྕགས, Wylie: gnam lcags) are Tibetan amulets which are said to have fallen from the sky in traditional Tibetan folklore. These are traditionally believed to contain a magical, protective power comparable to Tibetan dzi beads. Most thokcha are made of a copper alloy.

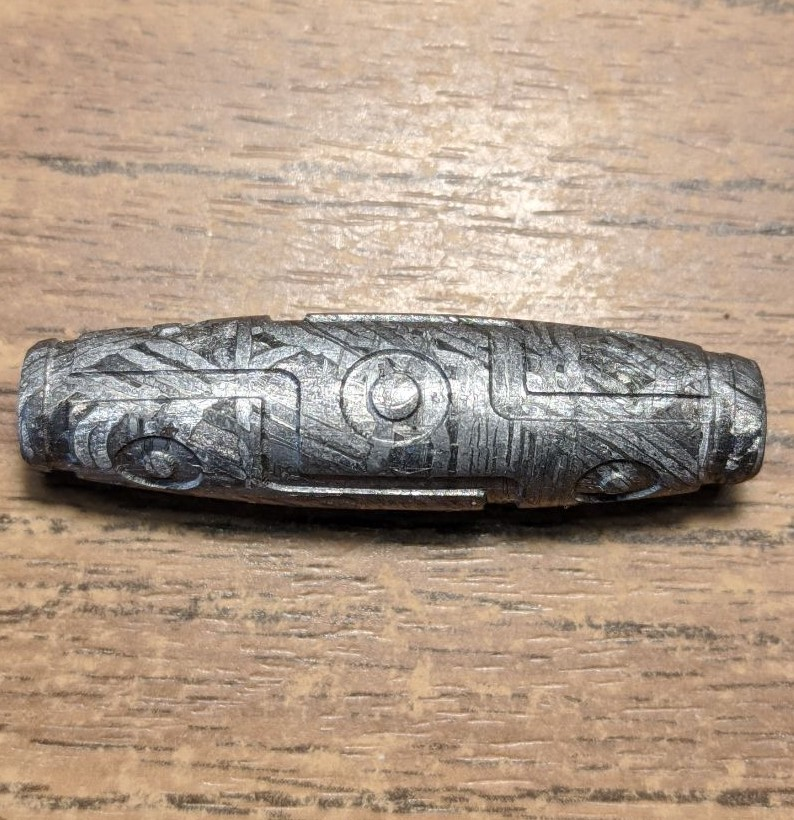
Meteorite dzi bead "9 eyes" carved from Aletai iron meteorite

The use of meteoric iron has been common throughout the history of ferrous metallurgy. Historically, thokcha were prized for the metallurgical fabrication of weapons, musical instruments, and sacred tools, such as the phurba. Thokcha are an auspicious addition in the metallurgical fabrication of sacred objects cast from panchaloha.

Writer Robert Beer regards meteoric iron as "the supreme substance for forging the physical representation of the vajra or other iron weapons." It was believed that these amulets had been tempered by the celestial gods before falling to Earth. Beer describes the metal falling from space as a metaphor for "the indivisibility of form and emptiness." Many meteorite fragments can be found in Tibet due to its high altitude and open landscape.

== Age ==
The age of Thokcha amulets are classified into two overlapping periods. The pre-Buddhist Ancient Bon (gdod ma'i Bon) period (c. 1000 BCE – c. 900 CE) and the Buddhist period (after 700). Some of the earliest thokcha are said to originate in the Zhangzhung culture.

== Types ==
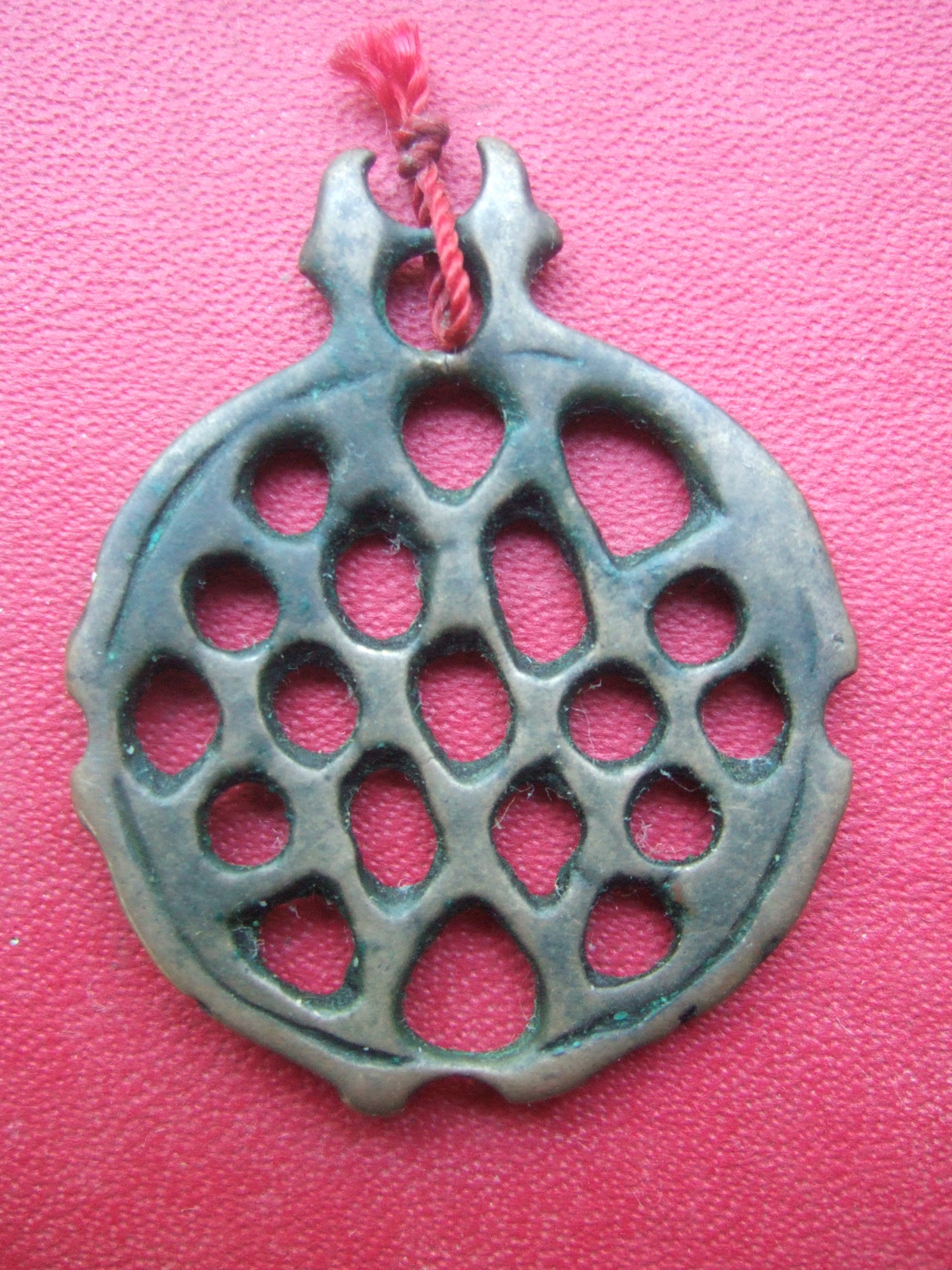
Tibetan thokcha

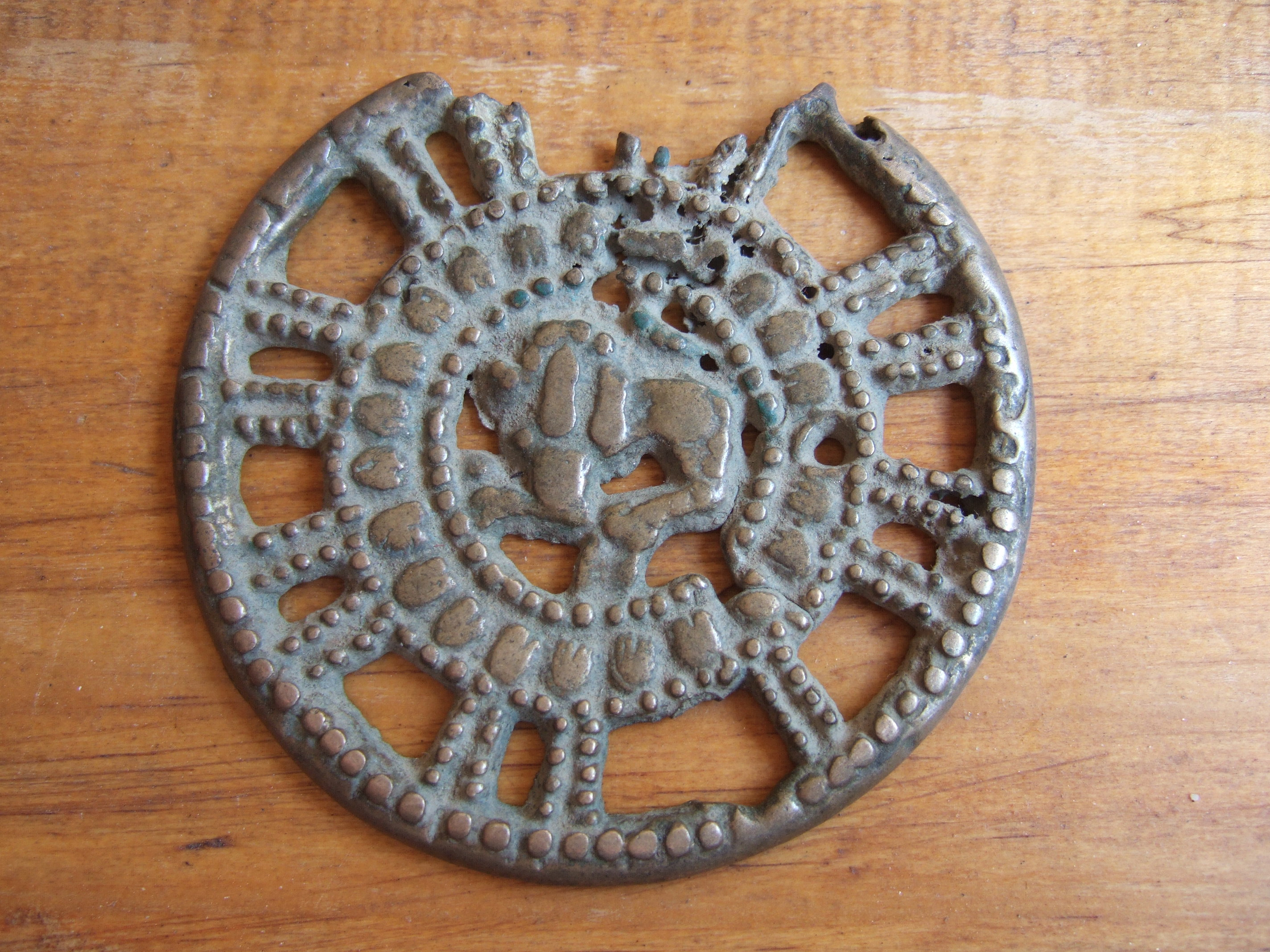
Tibetan thokcha, showing crouching lion in centre

Thokcha are metal objects approximately 2–15 centimetres (0.79–5.91 in), originally made to function as horse harnesses, buckles, fibulae, and arrowheads. Many years later, after their creation, they are reused by the Tibetan people as protective amulets and adornments for clothing, lighters, and purses.

Some thokcha may represent real or legendary creatures, often being deities originating from Bon or Buddhism. However, since many thokcha pieces are very abstract in their forms, the precise figures they are made to represent remain uncertain.

== History ==
Thogchags or Thokcha (Wylie: Thog lcags) are worn as amulets by Tibetans, specifically people of the Himalayan regions, for spiritual protection and healing. Created in several forms, they often depict tantric deities, sacred animals, auspicious symbols, and mantras. Many represent ritual supports such as a mirror, phurba, or vajra. Some pieces may be abstract in nature, and the meaning of the form has since been lost in antiquity. Further research is still in the process. Other Thokcha were simply used as ancient arrow points, buckles, body armour, or even old horse trappings.

Genuine pieces are believed to be made from a combination of meteorite, iron, bronze, copper, and a number of other metals. A few of the pre-Buddhist pieces originate from Persia or Central Asia and some are as ancient as 3,000 years old. The rarest and most sought after thokcha are believed to be made from a meteoric metal known as 'Namchak,' which literally means 'sky iron' or 'sky metal.' Very old pieces can have a distinct patina and have been worn out into smooth surfaces after centuries of handling. Many ornaments have unique textures which are almost impossible to replicate.

== Popular belief ==
The word Thokcha is composed of two words; thog that means above, primordial, first, or thunderbolt, and lcags that stands for iron or metal, so the literal meaning of thokcha is "original iron" or "thunderbolt iron."

A popular Tibetan belief is that thokcha are produced magically when a thunderbolt strikes the earth. Historically, it was believed that if one was to find a thokcha underground by chance, they would work as a good luck charm.

A gesture of sympathetic magic portrays that if you cast vajras from the metal, it would return a piece of the original iron to the site where it was found.

== See also ==
- Glossary of meteoritics
- Iron Man, a Tibetan sculpture of Vaiśravaṇa carved from an iron meteorite
- Panchaloha
- Orichalcum
