= Cóilín Ó Dubhghaill =

Irish artist and academic

Cóilín Ó Dubhghaill is an Irish artist and academic, crafting as a silversmith and also in copper and Japanese-inspired copper alloys, gold and other metals. He lived in Japan and studied Japanese metal crafts for seven years in the national arts university. His art is held in a range of national and other museums and galleries, and has been widely shown. His research work bridges art and materials science, and he is co-inventor of a new hybrid metal, mikana.

== Early life ==
Ó Dubhghaill was born in Dublin, Ireland, in June 1974, the youngest of three children of two primary school teachers, and educated in Knocklyon, a suburb within County Dublin.

== Education and career ==
=== Academic career ===
After completing the Irish Leaving Certificate in 1991, Ó Dubhghaill began craft studies at Grennan Mill Craft School, Thomastown, a joint project of Grennan College and the then Kilkenny VEC. He continued from 1992-1996 at Edinburgh College of Art, then associated with Heriot-Watt University, with a period on exchange at Maine College of Art. Graduating with an honours BA in Design and Applied Arts, he went on to win two scholarships for further study in the United States.

Ó Dubhghaill started a new phase in his studies and career with a move to Japan in 1998 on a Monbusho Scholarship. He studied at the Tokyo University of the Arts, often known as Geidai, working towards a Masters from 2000-2002, and then until 2005 for a PhD in Fine Arts.

He took up a post as a visiting lecturer and researcher at the Glasgow School of Art from 2005-2007, and then moved to a permanent role as a senior research fellow, which includes work with students, at the Faculty of Arts, Computing, Engineering and Sciences of Sheffield Hallam University, in 2007, where he continues to teach and work, including with the Art and Design Research Centre (ADRC) and the Materials and Engineering Research Institute (MERI).

Ó Dubhghaill has been a visiting lecturer at institutions including his almae mater, the Hong Kong Design Institute, the Australian National University at Canberra, RMIT University at Melbourne, Tama Art University (Tamabi) in Japan, the London Metropolitan University and the National College of Art and Design in Dublin, and he has produced a range of papers including several on the topics of Japanese irogane metals and mokume gane, and interdisciplinarity.

==== Advanced materials ====
Ó Dubhghaill worked, and led others in projects where he was Principal Investigator, for several years, with funding of over 270,000 GBP from 2007-2010, from the Arts and Humanities Research Council of England, to study irogane ("coloured metal") alloys, the niiro patination process and related matters.

As a development from his work on mokume gane, a material notoriously difficult and costly to produce at both small and large scales, Ó Dubhghaill has participated in the development of a new type of hybrid metal alloy, mikana, with properties similar to the output of mokume gane while aiming to be more manageable and affordable.

=== Craftwork ===
Ó Dubhghaill specialises in the making of vessels (hollowware), using a mix of hammering, welding and patination processes, many inspired by Japanese traditions little known in the West, such as the use of shakudō, shibuichi and other irogane metals, and niiro eki patination, as well as TIG welding (Gas tungsten arc welding), mokume gane, and friction stir welding. In recent years, he has also innovated the traditional tulipiere form of vase.

After graduation in 1996, he worked as a designer in industry, in India, the Philippines and the UK, and set up a workshop in Kilkenny in Ireland. During his advanced academic career, he continued to fabricate works, and to make them available for private sale and public collection, with examples now held by bodies such as the National Museum of Ireland, Glasgow Cathedral, the Worshipful Company of Goldsmiths and the Incorporation of Goldsmiths, a division of the Incorporated Trades of Edinburgh, the Irish State for the Department of Foreign Affairs and Farmleigh House, the Crafts and Design Council of Ireland, Birmingham Assay Office, city of Toride, Galway City Museum and the Marzee Collection in the Netherlands.

Ó Dubhghaill was also recognised with awards such as a 1996 Designer Silversmith Award from the Company of Goldsmiths, a Silver Design Award from the Birmingham Assay Office, an Arts Council of England Grant in 2009 and the Bavarian State Prize in 2015. He is represented by one of the world's largest specialist galleries for jewellery and smithcraft, the Galerie Marzee in the Netherlands, and is also a member of Contemporary Applied Arts in London, which admits only applied artists meeting certain criteria.

In 2018 his home city, Sheffield, commissioned a piece for the Sheffield Galleries and Museums Trust (operating as Museums Sheffield), the first large work to include the new hybrid metal he co-invented, mikana; the piece was sponsored by the Contemporary Art Society.

==== Studio ====
Ó Dubhghaill has a studio and workshop at the Persistence Works facility operated by Yorkshire ArtSpace. The Yorkshire ArtSpace studios have an Open Day once a year, when all studios can be visited.

=== Exhibitions ===
Ó Dubhghaill began to actively exhibit in the mid-2000s and shows in which he participated include:

- solo exhibitions at the Galerie Marzee (2006, 2008, 2016), and at galleries in London and Edinburgh
- more than 40 group exhibitions, including Silver of the Stars which was shown at the Victoria and Albert Museum, the Hermitage Museum in St. Petersburg, the Museum of Kyoto and the World Art Museum in Beijing, and later elsewhere in Europe, and which included a tea set custom-made for Billy Connolly. Other exhibitions have taken place in cities including Amsterdam, Dublin, Edinburgh, Geneva, London, Munich, Paris, San Francisco, Sheffield, as well as Dun Laoghaire, Galway, and Kilkenny in Ireland.

From 2013-2014 to 2017-2018, he has also been one of the biennial Design and Craft Council of Ireland (formerly the Crafts Council) selections, as representing "the leading edge of Irish contemporary craft in a world-class context."

=== Residencies ===
Ó Dubhghaill was artist-in-residence at the Centre Culturel Irlandais in Paris, France, for August 2019, researching French metalwork techniques, contemporary and dinanderie and preparing a 2020 exhibition.

== Publications ==
Among Ó Dubhghaill's academic papers are:

=== Formal academic papers ===
- Albuquerque, New Mexico, US, 2009: Bell, Eddie (ed.) Proceedings of the Santa Fe Symposium on Jewelry Manufacturing Technology 2009: (Paper) O'Dubhghaill, C. and Jones, A.H., Japanese irogane alloys and patination – a study of production and application.
- Brussels, Belgium, Koninklijke Vlaamse Academie van Belgie, 2010: Gimeno-Martinez, J. and Flore, F. (eds.), Design and craft: proceedings of the 7th International Conference on Design History and Design Studies (ICDHS), 20–22 September 2010: (Paper) O'Dubhghaill, C., Mokume Gane: a reinvention.

=== Working and exhibition materials ===
- Glasnevin, Dublin, Ireland, Dublin City University, 2017: Make:Shift Ireland, 6 November 2017 (event circulation only): O'Dubhghaill, C., Intersection: traditional craft process and new technology.

== Personal life ==
Ó Dubhghaill lives in Sheffield, Yorkshire.
