= Alan Hywel Jones =

British materials scientist

Alan Hywel Jones, usually Hywel Jones professionally, is a British materials scientist, working on ceramic composites and body armour, tribology, metals, including sustainable use of precious metals and rare-earth elements, and decorative alloys, wear-resistant coatings, materials analysis and ballistics, and friction-stir methods (welding and processing). He has appeared on radio and television to discuss some of his areas of interest.

== Early life ==
Jones was born in Wales in 1970, and attended school in Ebbw Vale, about 37 kilometres (23 mi) north of Cardiff.

== Education and career ==
=== Academic career ===
Jones studied at the University of Warwick from 1988 to 1997, receiving a BSc in Physics (1991), an MSc in Materials Characterisation (1993), and a PhD titled Synthesis and Tribology of Sialon / TiB2 Ceramic Composite (1997). He then secured a post as a post-doctoral research fellow and worked over three years on an EU-funded project on ultra-hard composites for tribological applications.

Jones moved to a post at Sheffield Hallam University's Materials and Engineering Research Institute (MERI) in 2000, and continues to work there. He became a senior consultant in 2004, then a senior research fellow, and is now a principal research fellow. He coordinates the consultancy activities of the institute, and has been involved in several hundred projects. Jones worked from 2008 to 2012 on UK Ministry of Defence-funded research into novel light-weight ceramic composite materials for personal armour, which in turn extended into armour-piercing ammunition, as well as kiln surfaces and high-wear industrial fittings.

His roles have also included membership in the Education and Skills Working Group of Materials UK, which produced a report on a 20-year strategy for UK materials science, the "What's in my stuff" public outreach and education campaign around recycling, and work as an expert witness in civil and criminal cases.

==== Recognition ====
Jones was a joint recipient of the Venture Prize of the Worshipful Company of Armourers and Brasiers, one of the ancient livery companies of London, for work on lightweight ceramic body armour, an award linked to the launch of university spin-off venture XeraCarb. He was also a recipient of a Yorkshire Forward Award.

==== Collaborations ====
Jones has worked closely with several fellow scientists and academics, including Anthony Pick, Karen Vernon-Parry, Cóilín Ó Dubhghaill and Maria Hanson.

=== Consultancy and commercialisation ===
In 2011, Jones co-founded a university spinoff company, XeraCarb Ltd., with Anthony Pick. With headquarters and factory in Barnsley, the company works on silicon carbide composite ceramics, suitable for body armour and kiln linings, among other applications. Following acquisition, the company has since February 2017 operated as part of Capital Refractories, within the CRL Group, with Jones retained as Chief Scientific Officer.

In 2016, Jones co-founded, with Cóilín Ó Dubhghaill and others, Mikana Innovations Ltd., a spin-off based on joint work between Sheffield Hallam University and Rotary Engineering Ltd.; he is today a director. This company produces a hybrid alloy, mikana, based on Japanese craft techniques, suitable for volume production for the making of jewellery and other luxury items, and hollowware.

==== Advanced materials ====
Jones has worked on a form of "stainless silver" alloy as well as advanced ceramics and the hybrid alloy mikana. The ceramics work has led to material advances in the making of personal armour and kiln lining, while mikana has properties similar to mokume gane while being more manageable and affordable.

== Personal life ==
Jones lives in the Sheffield suburb of Crookes.
