= Muela (knife manufacturer) =

Spanish knife manufacturer

Manufacturas Muela S.A.
- Company type: S.A.
- Founded: 1952; 74 years ago
- Founder: Eladio Muela
- Headquarters: Ciudad Real, Spain
- Products: Knives
- Website: Muela.eu

Muela (full name Manufacturas Muela) is a Spanish knife manufacturer based in Ciudad Real with an annual output of about 350,000 pieces a year. The products include hunting, combat, luxury, outdoor and folding knives and knife accessories.

== History ==
The company was founded by Eladio Muela who celebrated, in 2002, 50 years since he created his first knife, a folding model.

== Materials ==
Most Muela knives are made of stainless steel alloys with vanadium, chromium and molybdenum content; few luxury items are made of pattern welded steel.
