= Niiro =

Historically Japanese patination process

Niiro (煮色, 'cooked color'), also known as niiro-eki (煮色液), niiro-chakushoku (煮色着色), nikomi-chakushoku (煮込み着色) or niage (煮上げ), is an historically Japanese patination process, responsible for the colouration of copper and certain of its alloys, resulting in the irogane class of craft metals, including shakudo, shibuichi and kuromido. It is now practiced in a number of countries, primarily for the making of jewellery and decorative sword fittings, but also for material for hollowware and sculpture. Importantly, the same process operates differently on different metals so that a piece with multiple components can be treated in one patination session, developing a range of colours.

== Etymology ==
All forms of the name refer to the nature of the patination process in Japanese, as this was an exclusively Japanese technique. Ni-iro refers to boiling or broiling, and colour (iro), as the patination is performed by heating the metal to be treated in a special liquid or solution (eki). Ni-age also refers to boiling. Chaku-shoku refers to colouring.

== Process ==
=== Formulation ===
The colouring and finishing of irogane surfaces generally involves polishing and cleaning, followed by the active chemical patination, and often further includes some waxing or other final treatment. A small range of chemical components are used in the process, with various of recipes for their combination; all traditional formulae include the compound called rokusho (緑青) but at least one modern formula omits rokusho as a distinct ingredient.

Sample formulae include:

- rokusho 11.25g, copper sulphate 5.63g, water 1.8l
- rokusho 5.63g, copper sulphate 5.63g, water 1.8l
- rokusho 5.63g, copper sulphate 5.63g, borax 0.375g, water 1.8l
- rokusho 3.75g, copper sulphate 3g, vinegar 1cm3, water 1.8l
- rokusho 3.75g, copper sulphate 3g, alum 1.13g, water 1.8l
- rokusho 3.75g, copper sulphate 3g, alum 0.375g, water 1.8 l
- rokusho 3g, copper sulphate 3g, water 1l
- copper sulphate 5g, copper acetate 2.65g, 0.65g sodium chloride, water 1l

Notably, Cóilín Ó Dubhghaill concluded after a study that common salt aided the effectiveness of the formula, while plum vinegar, often mentioned as an additive, he found to be unhelpful.

=== Preparation ===
Cleaning is vital for both quality and predictability of the process. At the end of the preparatory phase, a piece to be coloured will also often be scrubbed with, or dipped in material from, a daikon radish. The precise contribution of the radish to the whole process is still under study.

=== Boiling ===
The actual boiling in solution is usually done in a copper container, with the piece to be coloured suspended in some way, for example in a bamboo basket. The final colour can depend on the duration of the boiling period – suaka, for example, may advance from a light brown after 2–4 hours, to orange-brown after 6 hours, to red towards 10 hours.

=== Finishing ===
After the core patination process, a piece may, optionally, be washed in cold water, dried, and then coated with a light wax, or in modern times, a sprayed resin.

== Colour range ==
Colours developed through the niiro process include:

- on refined copper (suaka): light orange to dark red, depending on duration of boiling
- on shakudo: lustrous purple to violet black, or a shade of purple (some shades are described as "like dark grapes"). Variations include shi-kin or kurasaki-kin, "purple gold," and u-kin, "cormorant gold," or "karasu-kin."
- on shibuichi: silvery, grey, olive brown
- on kuromido: dark coppery-black
- on sentoku: yellow to brown

The material known as yamagane ("mountain metal"), naturally occurring copper with impurities, produces a wide range of colours, depending on its precise composition.

== Study ==
Some analysis of treated surfaces done in an attempt to understand the topic further, with considerable but still partial success. Researchers, some of whom also have a craft background, have also explored ways to make the process more predictable, and / or simpler, and at least one patent has been filed in this area. Murakami, Giumlia-Mair, O Dubhghaill and Jones, and Kawasaki are some of the scholars in this area, with O Dubhghaill (also a metalworker) and Jones, and Kawasaki, also working on "new" methods.

== Practitioners ==
In Japan, certain workshops and a range of craft workers actively use niiro techniques. Techniques are passed down in craft circles, represented by trade bodies, and within at least one major university, the Tokyo University of the Arts, often known as "Geidai," the metalwork department of which preserves formulae and techniques. In the West, craftspeople actively using niiro include Cóilín Ó Dubhghaill.

In the USA there are several practitioners. Jim Kelso has been using irogane alloys and the associated niiro (niage) patina since the mid 1980s. He began by using information from alloy smith Phillip Baldwin and progressed after receiving a workshop summary given by Satsuo Ando in 1979 in California.

Kelso was able to refine his patina technique after spending time with Toshimasa-sensei (Sakai Masaichi) in Osaka in 1988. That journey was under fellowship with the Asian Cultural Council During that visit he was also able to meet with Prof. Hiramatsu at Tokyo University of the Arts (Geidai) metals department, as well as subsequent visits with other professors there.

Kelso's websiteincludes a tutorial section on his use of Japanese irogane alloys including the niiro patina.

== Effects ==
The traditional patination methods have little or no effect on silver and gold elements, allowing for interesting effects. Other effects are created by cutting through layers of patination to let underlying surfaces show through partly.

== History ==
The method has existed for at least 600 years but if some of the alleged origin timings for shakudo are valid, then, since niiro is intrinsically linked to the production of that patinated alloy, its history may extend over 1200 years.

The details of the processes and especially the compositions of the materials used to bathe the metals, are passed on within Japanese craft circles, and not widely documented, though some information was written down from the middle of the Edo period, and published more generally, in Japanese, in the early 20th century.

Attention to niiro and the irogane metals it produces came to the West in the late 19th century, in a period when the metalcrafts of Japan were in decline due to changes in tastes.
