= Rokushō =

Traditional Japanese chemical compound

Rokushō (緑青) is a traditional Japanese chemical compound used in the niiro process for artificially inducing patination in decorative non-ferrous metals, especially several copper alloys, with the results being metals of the irogane class. It is most commonly translated as malachite; in art, rokushō was the most widely used green pigment.

These "colour metals", virtually unknown outside Japan until the late 19th century, have achieved some popularity in craft circles in other parts of the world since then.

== Usage ==
Rokushō is used to treat a number of metals, including raw natural copper, which holds impurities, purified copper, and copper alloy mixes with two to five metals, to produce irogane metals, including: shakudō, an alloy of copper and gold, which becomes black to dark blue-violet; shibuichi, an alloy of fine silver and copper (in a higher percentage than sterling), which turns grey to misty aquamarine or other shades of blue to green; kuromido which becomes dark coppery black.

Rokushō was generally used to patinate all types of mokume-gane ("wood grain metal") as well.

Although other patination agents can be used on these metals, some artisans prefer the rich colors achieved with traditional rokushō in the niiro process.

These metals are becoming increasingly popular in high-end artistic jewelry, especially in bi-metals (a layer of the alloy fused to another metal such as sterling). Because rokushō has a dramatically different effect on sterling silver than on the alloys typically fused to it in bi-metals, a common technique in art jewelry is to engrave through the alloy layer in a pattern to reveal the silver underneath prior to patination. This provides a rich contrast in color, highlighting the pattern.

== Formulation ==
The formulae for rokushō are not published widely or freely, but passed on in the Japanese craft tradition. However, some scholars have analysed samples of the material.

Premixed rokushō can be purchased outside Japan through specialty jewelry suppliers. Additionally, several different formulas have been proposed to replicate the traditional product for those who prefer to make their own:

- In a container made of glass, porcelain, or copper, dissolve 6 g copper acetate, 2 g calcium carbonate, and 2 g sodium hydroxide in 150 ml water. After a week, siphon or decant the clear liquid from the top; just before use, add another 2 g copper sulfate.
- Dissolve 4 g copper acetate, 1 g copper nitrate, 1 g cupric chloride, and 4 g copper sulfate in 1 liter of distilled water.
- Dissolve 60 g copper acetate and 60 g copper sulfate in a 2-liter solution of white vinegar diluted 5-12% with water.

Rokusho is not used alone, but mixed with one or more other chemicals. Further, metal to be processed is cleaned in advance of treatment, using a mild acid bath (oxalic or sulfuric acids are frequently used), scrubbing with daikon radish or pumice, and/or a surface abrasive, and often treated after patination also.
