= Laminated steel blade =

Type of blade

A laminated steel blade or piled steel is a knife, sword, or other tool blade made out of layers of differing types of steel, rather than a single homogeneous alloy. The earliest steel blades were laminated out of necessity, due to the early bloomery method of smelting iron, which made production of steel expensive and inconsistent. Laminated steel offered both a way to average out the properties of the steel, as well as a way to restrict high-carbon steel to the areas that needed it most. Laminated steel blades are still produced today for specialized applications, where different requirements at different points in the blade are met by use of different alloys, forged together into a single blade.

== Technique ==
Piled steel developed out of the necessarily complex process of making blades that were both hard and tough from the erratic and unsuitable output from early iron smelting in bloomeries. The bloomery does not generate temperatures high enough to melt iron and steel, but instead reduces the iron oxide ore into particles of pure iron, which then weld into a mass of sponge iron, consisting of lumps of impurities in a matrix of relatively pure iron, with a carbon content of around 0.06%. The bloom must then be heated and hammered to work out the impurities, resulting in the relatively soft wrought iron.

Iron is too soft to make a good cutting edge; a good edge requires the addition of carbon to make steel. By heating thin iron rods in a carbon-rich forge, carbon could be added to the surface, making a thin layer of steel on the surface through a process called carburization (see also case hardening). From the beginning of the Iron Age, around 1200 BC, piled steel was the only way to get good steel. Obtaining the right level of carbon was an art, and was very important to the finished product. Too much carbon, or too many of the wrong trace elements, and the resulting steel becomes too hard and brittle, which can result in a catastrophic failure of a sword; too little carbon and the sword will not hold an edge. The ideal sword is one with a hard, sharp edge, and tough enough to bend, but not to shatter.

Blending a number of different pieces of iron and steel together averaged out the properties, ensuring that one bad piece would not produce a total failure of the finished product. This laminating different alloys together produces patterns that, with proper treatment, can be seen in the surface of the finished blade, and this forms the basis for pattern welding.

== Other uses of laminated steel ==
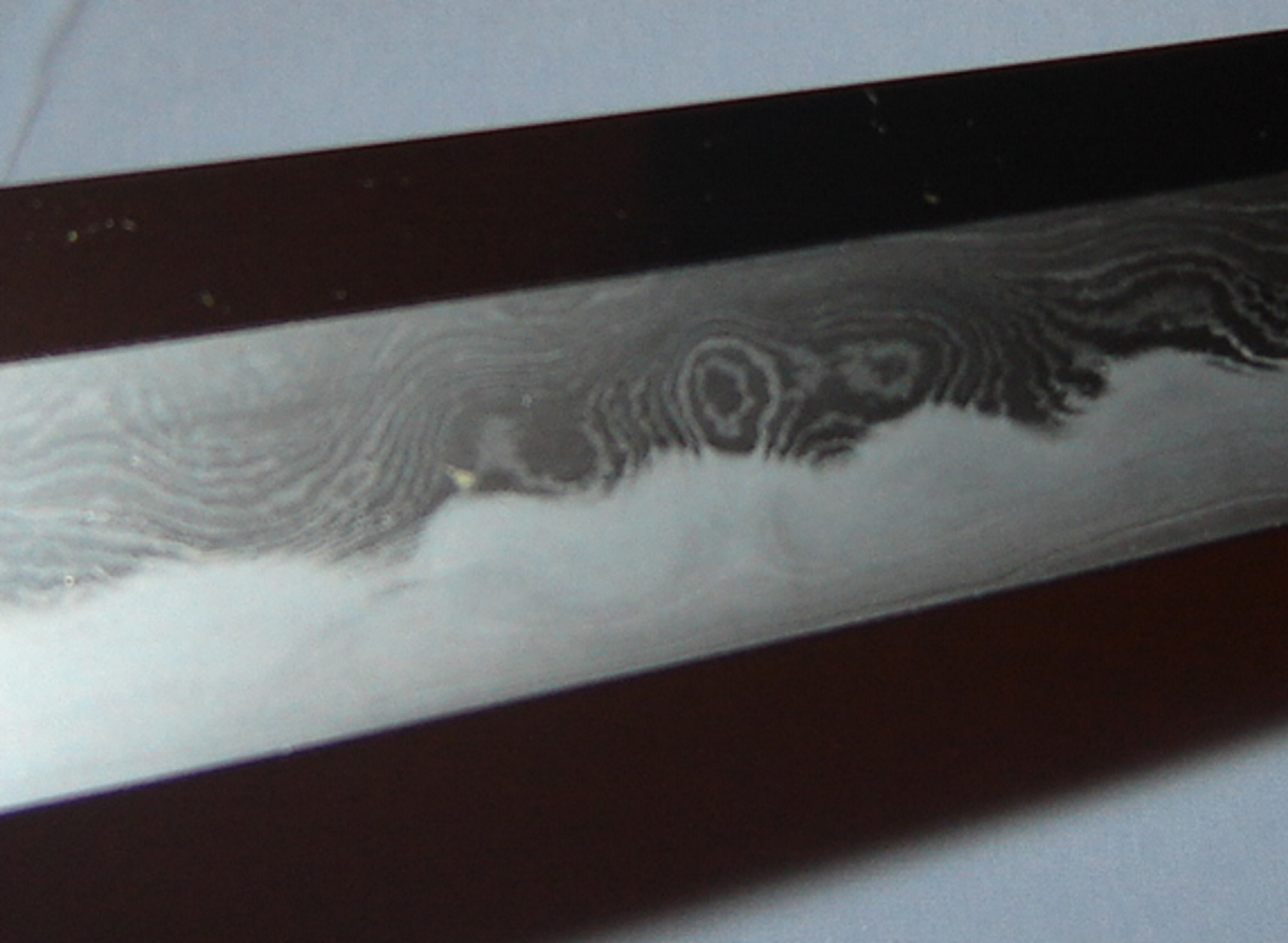
A Japanese katana made of laminated steel. The outer skin is forged from alternating layers of steel with differing carbon content, and folded upon itself many times, producing a mokume (wood-eye) pattern.

Since producing high-carbon steel from wrought iron was very difficult, careful lamination of different alloys also served to conserve this difficult-to-make steel by using it only for the parts of the blades where it was needed. Many swords were made with the minimum possible amount of high-carbon steel along the cutting edge, with the rest of the blade being made of low-carbon steel or wrought iron. A thin strip of high-carbon steel could be laminated between two layers of softer steel, or a core of soft steel could be wrapped in high-carbon steel. The Japanese katana was often found with complex patterns of soft and hard steels; having 5 sections of differing hardness welded together to form the final blade was not uncommon. The end result would be a blade with a very high carbon edge (as much as 1.0%, equal to the highest carbon content found in low alloy steels in use today) and a softer spine. The very hard, but brittle, edge made the swords stay extremely sharp, while the spine gave the blade flexibility, so that it would bend rather than break.

Many laminated steel blades, particularly those of the Vikings, also used complex structures of steel to produce patterns in the surface of the steel. These patterns were made by manipulating the piles, by twisting or otherwise distorting the piles, before they were forged into the blade.

== Modern use of laminate steel ==
Modern laminated steel is still found in specialty knives and cutting tools, constructed of multiple alloys of steel to provide specific properties at different areas of the blade. Pattern welding is common in hand-made knives, where the primary goal is to provide a visually striking pattern in the final etched blade. Laminated steel also finds use in the construction of padlocks, where the structure of the material makes it more difficult for the lock to be destroyed by tools like hammers and drills.

== See also ==
- Mokume-gane
- Damascus steel
- Japanese swordsmithing
- Toledo steel
