= Shotaro Sanada =

Japanese painter and researcher (born 2000)

- 真田 将太朗
- Born: December 9, 2000 (age 25); Nishinomiya, Hyōgo, Japan
- Education: Tokyo University of the Arts (B.A.); University of Tokyo (M.A.); Royal College of Art (enrolled)
- Known for: Abstract painting, aesthetics and AI research
- Website: shotaro-sanada.com

Shotaro Sanada (Japanese: 真田 将太朗, born 9 December 2000) is a Japanese painter and researcher. He is known for large-scale abstract paintings that explore "new landscapes" and for interdisciplinary work linking art, aesthetics, and artificial intelligence.

In 2025, Sanada founded SANADA WORKS Inc. and became its president. After completing his master's degree at the University of Tokyo, he enrolled in the painting programme of the Royal College of Art in London. He is also a visiting researcher at Shiga University's Data Science and AI Innovation Research Center and a special lecturer at Chuo University.

== Early life and family ==
Sanada was born in Nishinomiya, Hyōgo Prefecture, Japan. Profiles published by Baton Inc. and East Japan Railway Company describe him as a descendant of Sengoku-period samurai general Sanada Yukimura.

He studied aesthetics in the Faculty of Fine Arts at the Tokyo University of the Arts and graduated in 2024. He later completed a master's degree at the Graduate School of Interdisciplinary Information Studies at the University of Tokyo, where he conducted research integrating art and artificial intelligence.

== Career ==
While still a student, Sanada began exhibiting works that combine elements of abstraction and landscape. His concept of "new landscapes" (Japanese: 新しい風景, atarashii fūkei) focuses on reconstructed perceptions of time, space, and physical communication. His practice includes large-scale paintings that employ vertical strokes and layered colour fields to evoke geological and architectural structures.

In 2023, Sanada was commissioned by East Japan Railway Company to create a permanent 10-metre mural for the main entrance of Nagano Station as part of the "Beyond Stations" project. The work, titled Twelve Pillars of Consecutive Views, was unveiled in October 2023.

Sanada has held solo exhibitions at venues including art brewing gallery – haco and Bumpodo Gallery in Tokyo, Ginza Tsutaya Books at GINZA SIX, and Tokyo International Gallery at Terrada Art Complex, as well as at department stores in Tokyo, Osaka, and Taipei.

Sanada is a member of Artoone!, a YouTube creator group formed by graduates of the Tokyo University of the Arts. In 2025, in addition to founding SANADA WORKS, he became an outside director of EmotionX Inc. In January 2026 he became co-representative of the creative team Kakukaku. In September 2026 he signed a management contract with Quaras Inc. In October 2026 he was featured on the TV Tokyo programme Tokyo Kosaten ONE MOMENT.

== Artistic style ==
Sanada's work investigates relationships between human creativity, perception, and information systems. His large-scale paintings often explore themes of gravity, time, and the "extended body", attempting to visualise invisible phenomena through abstract compositions and vertically structured landscapes. He also conducts research on aesthetics and artificial intelligence, using generative and computational methods alongside traditional painting.

== Selected exhibitions ==
- 2022 – from, art brewing gallery – haco, Tokyo.
- 2023 – ACROSS, Bumpodo Gallery, Tokyo.
- 2024 – OVER, Street Dreams Studios Tokyo.
- 2024 – Process Landscape, Ginza Tsutaya Books (Artwall)
- 2025 – BETWEEN: Landscape and You, Tokyo International Gallery, Tokyo.
- 2025 – POINT OF VIEW, Ginza Tsutaya Books (FOAM CONTEMPORARY), Tokyo.
- 2025 – NEXT LANDSCAPE, Hankyu Hanshin Umeda Flagship Store, Osaka.
- 2025 – Our Silhouette, Hankyu Hanshin Umeda Flagship Store, Osaka.
- 2025 – FLAT, Kyoto Tsutaya Books, Kyoto.
- 2026 – FOR, Gallery & Bakery Tokyo 8min (Toda Building), Tokyo.
- 2026 – Back to Blue, Kobe Hankyu, Kobe.
- 2026 – Not Yet Moving, Geidai Art Plaza, Tokyo.
- 2026 – PLAYSCAPE, Matsuzakaya Nagoya, Nagoya.
- 2026 – HERE to THERE, Mitsukoshi Contemporary Gallery, Nihombashi Mitsukoshi, Tokyo.

== Awards ==
- Selected for the 16th Geidai Art Plaza Grand Prize Exhibition.
- Winner of the 21st Best Debutant Award in the Film / Graphic Art category (2025).
- Scholar of the KUMA Foundation (9th term, selected in 2025).
