= Titanium ring =

Jewelry rings or bands mainly of titanium

Titanium rings are jewelry rings or bands which have been primarily constructed from titanium. The actual compositions of titanium can vary, such as "commercial pure" (99.2% titanium) or "aircraft grade" (primarily, 90% titanium, 6% aluminum, 4% vanadium), and titanium rings are often crafted in combination with other materials, such as gemstones and traditional jewelry metals. Even with these variations in composition and materials, titanium rings are commonly referred to as such if they contain any amount of titanium.

Rings crafted from titanium are a modern phenomenon, becoming widely available on the market around the 1990s. Titanium rings offer several unique properties: they are biocompatible (hypoallergenic), lightweight, corrosion-resistant, and have the highest strength-to-weight ratio of any crystalline metal.

== History ==
Titanium was discovered in Cornwall, England, in 1791 by William Gregor. It was also discovered around the same time by Hungarian mineralogist Franz-Joseph Müller von Reichenstein, and later in 1795 by German chemist Martin Heinrich Klaproth – who gave titanium its name, a reference to the Titans of Greek mythology.

However, it was not until after 1932 that commercial use for titanium became possible, due to methods established by William Justin Kroll. Kroll devised ways of reducing titanium tetrachloride (TiCl_{4}) into its metal form. His process is still used today for commercially-produced titanium.

The cost of titanium rings can be very high. This is ostensibly because the process of extracting titanium from its various ores is laborious and costly. Although it is indeed expensive as an engineering material, it is far less expensive than the jeweler's usual precious metals, even silver. At the start of 2014, no prices for pure titanium or its common commercial alloys exceeded US $10 per pound. The process of machining titanium rings is expensive, and necessary since the metal is nearly impossible to craft by rolling or soldering in the way silver, gold, and even platinum are formed.

It is unknown who first crafted titanium into a ring or other jewelry piece. A titanium wedding-ring is used as a minor plot-point in the 1989 science fiction film and novel The Abyss. Titanium started appearing on the open market in approximately the 1990s. Since 2000, availability of titanium rings has become large-scale, with most online and bricks-and-mortar jewelry stores likely to carry titanium-based rings as part of their inventory. Many outlets now specialize exclusively in the design and sale of titanium rings.

== Construction ==
Titanium rings are constructed using solid bars, tubes or sheets of titanium, which are cut into the desired shape and size of a ring. The metal can be machined using the same equipment and via the same engineering processes as stainless steel. The usual jewelry-making techniques of rolling and soldering are not practical for titanium, although they can be fabricated by welding in an inert atmosphere using, for example, a laser welder.

== Properties ==
Titanium has become popular as a jewelry material due to its various unique properties. Titanium is biocompatible (often referred to as hypoallergenic), or non-toxic to the human body. Similarly, titanium rings will not react with wearers who suffer allergies to other jewelry materials.

It is highly resistant to most causes of corrosion, including sea water, aqua regia, chlorine (in water), and some acids. It is soluble in concentrated acids, however. Titanium rings are therefore practical jewelry for those who regularly swim in the ocean or chlorinated pools. This is in contrast to some traditional jewelry materials, such as silver, brass, and bronze, which are prone to tarnish or other deterioration.

Titanium rings generally have higher fatigue resistance and strength-to-weight ratios than most other metals.

Titanium rings are difficult but possible to resize. The amount of the reduction and increase is limited.

They are only slightly more difficult to cut off in case of emergency than for gold rings; titanium is comparable to steel in its resistance to sawing.

== Anodizing ==
Anodization of titanium rings is the process whereby an oxide film is formed on the surface of the titanium via an electrolytic process to create color. In the case of titanium rings, this process is performed after it is machined into shape. Oxidation changes the ordinary titanium color (generally silver, depending on composition and processing) and increases corrosion-resistance. The anodization process is extremely simple to carry out: the piece is immersed in an electrolyte, cola is popularly used, and a DC voltage, around 100 volts, is applied. The voltage controls the thickness, and thus the colour, of the anodization.

Colors achievable through the anodization of titanium.

Dyes are not necessary to color anodized titanium. The color that results on a titanium ring depends on the thickness of the oxide coating, which is determined by the anodizing voltage. The image to the left shows the color spectrum range that can be achieved by anodizing. The colors, which are simply different wavelengths of light, arise from constructive interference between the light reflected from the surface of the oxide layer and light reflected from the metal surface below.

== Titanium compositions ==
Titanium can be alloyed with many other metals to enhance or alter titanium's properties. The most common alloy partners for titanium are aluminium, vanadium, iron, molybdenum and copper. Each alters titanium's properties for various purposes – for example, copper can be used to harden titanium.

One of the most common compositions for titanium rings is known as "aircraft grade" (also referred to as 6AL-4V or 6-4) titanium, because the composition is famous for its use in aircraft construction (however, it is also used for medical, marine and chemical processing purposes). It is a blend of 6% aluminum, 4% vanadium and 90% titanium (as well as trace amounts of iron and oxygen; max 0.25% and 0.2% respectively), and is one of the strongest and most lightweight of other known compositions. Aircraft grade titanium is often used in crafting titanium rings due to its advantageous and suitable properties (compared with other titanium compositions), as well as its wide commercial availability.

== Inlays ==
Inlays are the result of combining two or more metals into one ring. It is not to be confused with alloying. The process of inlaying involves crushing the metals into channels, which are then trapped under pressure. On a ring, this usually results in metals sitting side-by-side on the surface – for example, a strip of gold running through the middle of an otherwise titanium ring.

The purpose of inlays are to enable the various metals within a titanium ring to be visibly distinguishable.

== Styles ==
Titanium rings have been crafted into various distinguishable styles over the brief history of their development as a jewelry item. Some of these styles are:

=== Classic ===
Titanium ring styles referred to as "classic" have generally been crafted into a simple oval or circle with a smooth, shiny finish. Besides ordinary machining, no external techniques or equipment are used in its production.

=== Mokume-gane ===
Mokume-gane gives titanium rings the appearance of wood-grain. It is a Japanese (also early Medieval European) forging technique that was applied to Samurai swords in the 17th century. It required great skill on the part of the smith, though modern processes today, such as controlled atmospheres and temperature-controlled furnaces, make the technique easier to achieve.

=== Sable ===
Sable gives the appearance of soft silk.

=== Frost ===
Frost titanium rings have the appearance of being frozen – specifically, the frozen condensation that appears on an item that has been placed in a freezer.

== See also ==
- Tungsten ring
