= Tokyo University of the Arts =

Art university in Tokyo, Japan

- 東京藝術大学
- Former names: Tokyo Fine Arts School (東京美術学校, Tōkyō Bijutsu Gakkō) (1887–1949); Tokyo Music School (東京音楽学校, Tōkyō Ongaku Gakkō) (1897–1947); Tokyo National University of Fine Arts and Music (1947–2008)
- Type: Public (National)
- Established: 1887: founding of previous institutions Tokyo Fine Arts School and Tokyo Music School; 1949: merger into Tokyo National University of Fine Arts and Music
- President: Katsuhiko Hibino
- Academic staff: 244 (2017)
- Administrative staff: 152 (2017)
- Students: 3,294 (2017)
- Undergraduates: 2,020 (2017)
- Postgraduates: 1,274 (2017)
- Location: Taitō, Tokyo, Japan; 35°43′10″N 139°46′22″E
- Campus: Ueno Campus, Senju Campus, Yokohama Campus, Toride Campus
- Colours: Blue
- Website: www.geidai.ac.jp/english/

Tokyo University of the Arts (東京藝術大学, Tōkyō Geijutsu Daigaku) or Tokyogeidai (東京芸大) is a school of art and music in Japan. Located in Ueno Park, it also has facilities in Toride, Ibaraki, Yokohama, Kanagawa, and Adachi, Tokyo. The university has trained artists in the fields of painting, sculpture, crafts, inter-media, sound, music composition, traditional instruments, art curation and global arts.

== History ==
Under the establishment of the National School Establishment Law, the university was formed in 1949 by the merger of the Tokyo Fine Arts School (東京美術学校, Tōkyō Bijutsu Gakkō) and the Tokyo Music School (東京音楽学校, Tōkyō Ongaku Gakkō), both founded in 1887. The former Tokyo Fine Arts School was then restructured as the Faculty of Fine Arts under the university.

Originally male-only, the school began to admit women in 1946. The graduate school opened in 1963, and began offering doctoral degrees in 1977. The doctoral degree in fine art practice initiated in the 1980s was one of the earliest programs to do so globally. After the abolition of the National School Establishment Law and the formation of the National University Corporations on April 1, 2004, the school became known as the Kokuritsu Daigaku Hōjin Tōkyō Geijutsu Daigaku (国立大学法人東京藝術大学). On April 1, 2008, the university changed its English name from "Tokyo National University of Fine Arts and Music" to "Tokyo University of the Arts".

The school has had student exchanges with some of the nation's most highly regarded art and music institutions the Academy of Fine Arts Vienna and the University of applied Arts, Vienna (Austria), the École des Beaux-Arts (France), School of the Art Institute of Chicago (USA), the Royal Academy of Music (UK), the University of Sydney and Queensland College of Art, Griffith University (Australia), the Korea National University of Arts, and the China Central Academy of Fine Arts.

== Departments ==
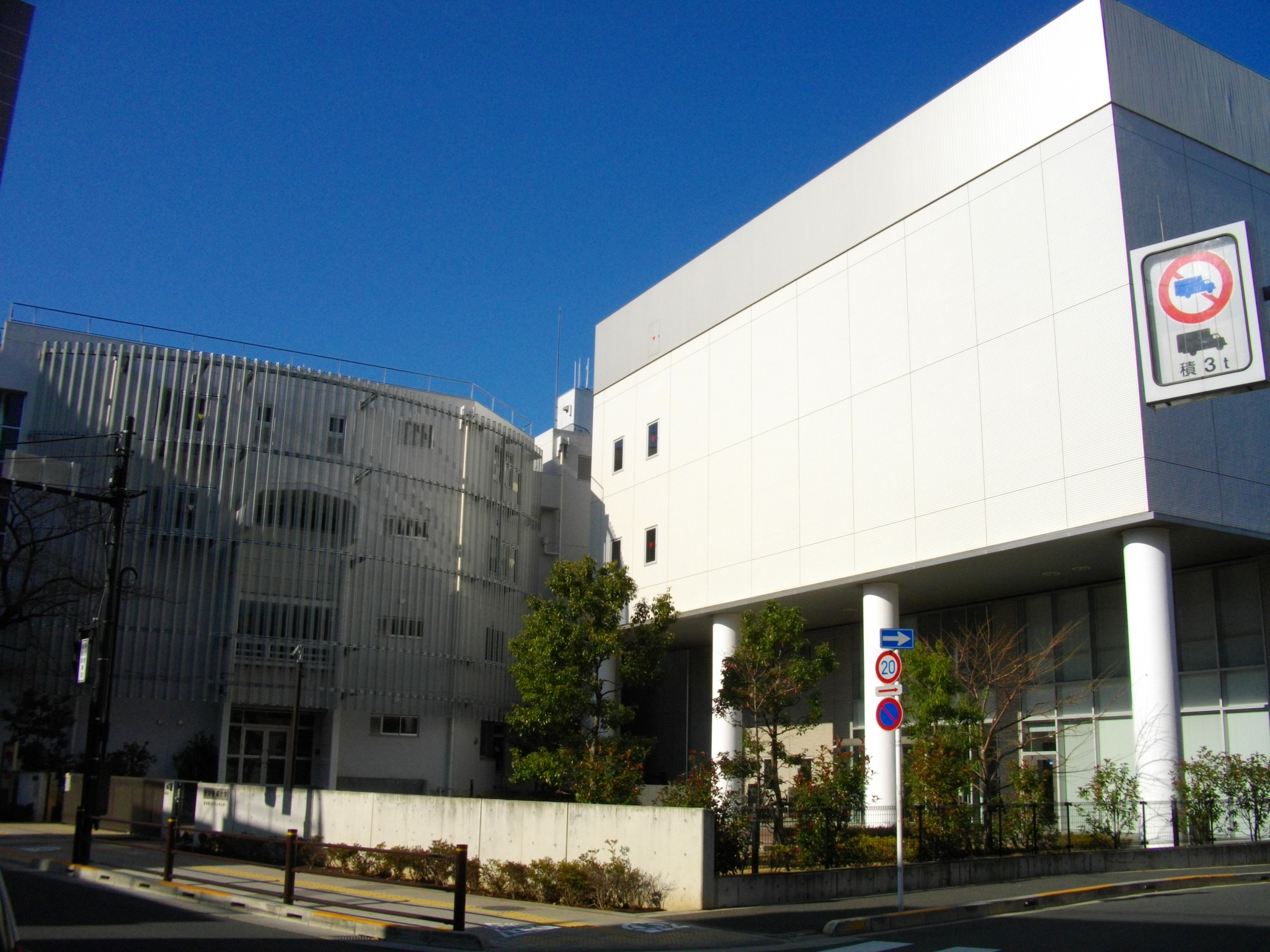
Senju Campus

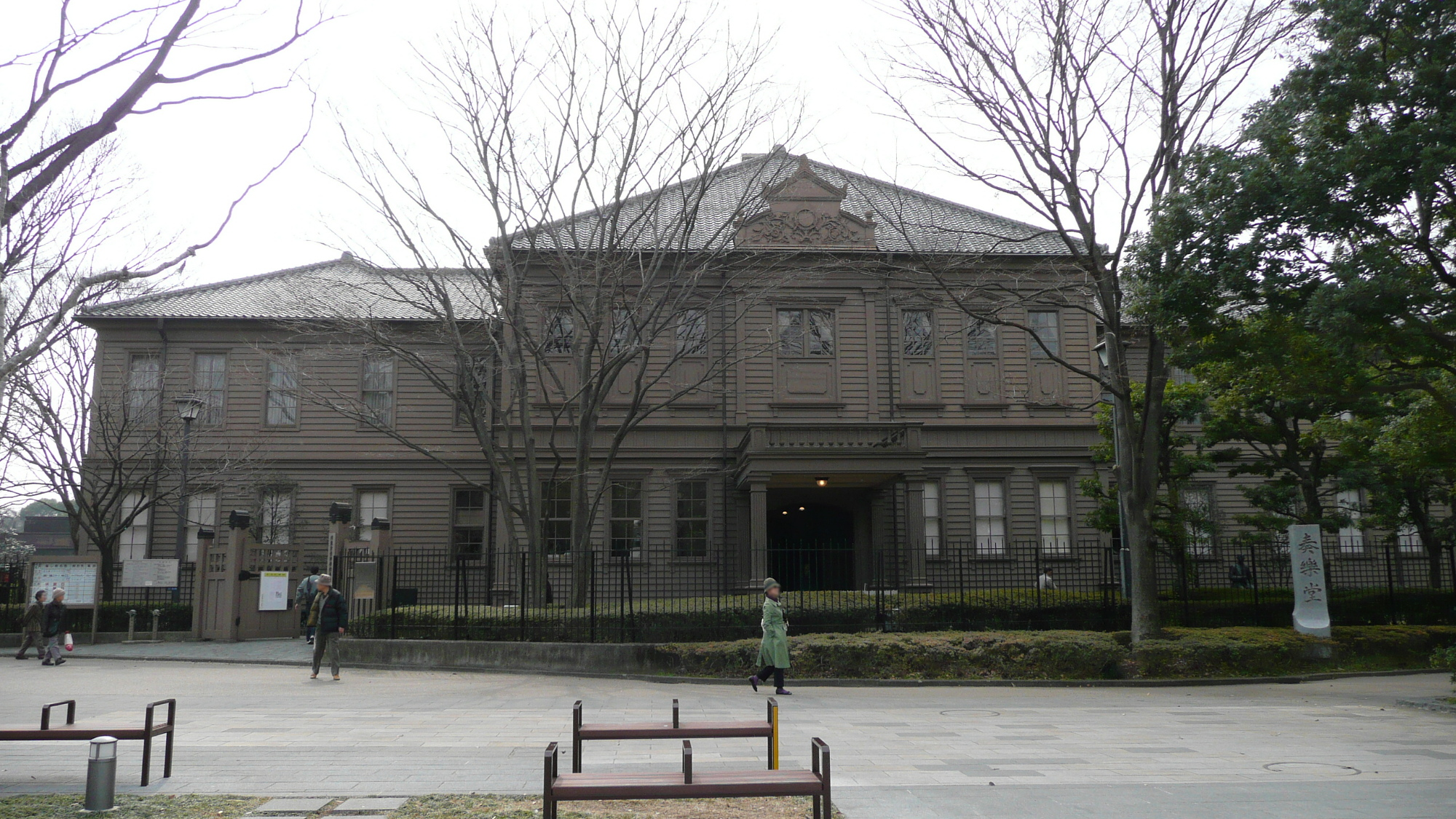
Oldest Music Concert Hall

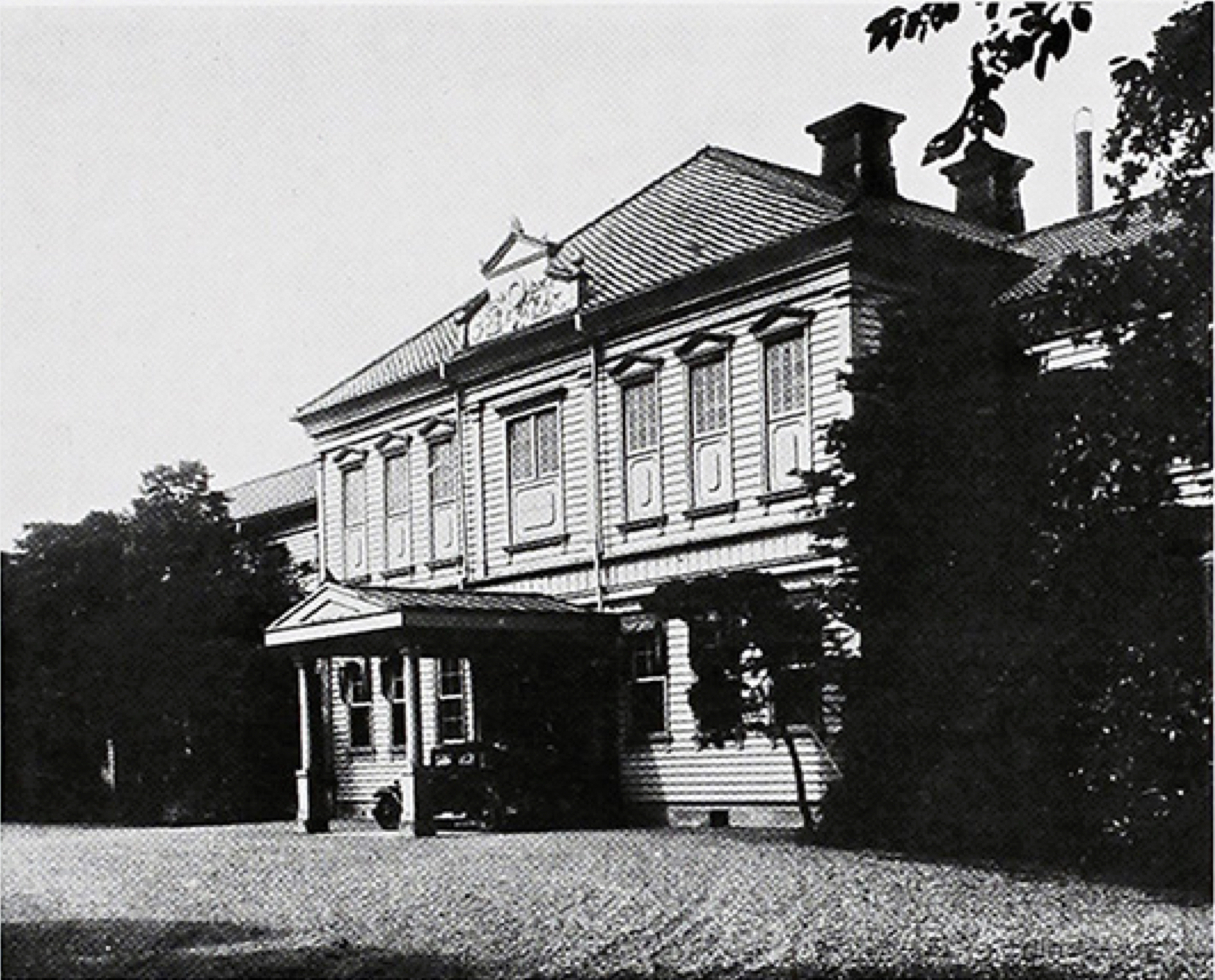
in 1926

=== Department of Fine Arts ===
(Includes undergraduate and graduate school programs)

- Japanese Painting
- Oil Painting
- Sculpture
- Craft
- Design
- Architecture and Planning
- Aesthetics and Art History
- Inter-media Arts
- Global Art Practice
- Conservation

=== Department of Music ===
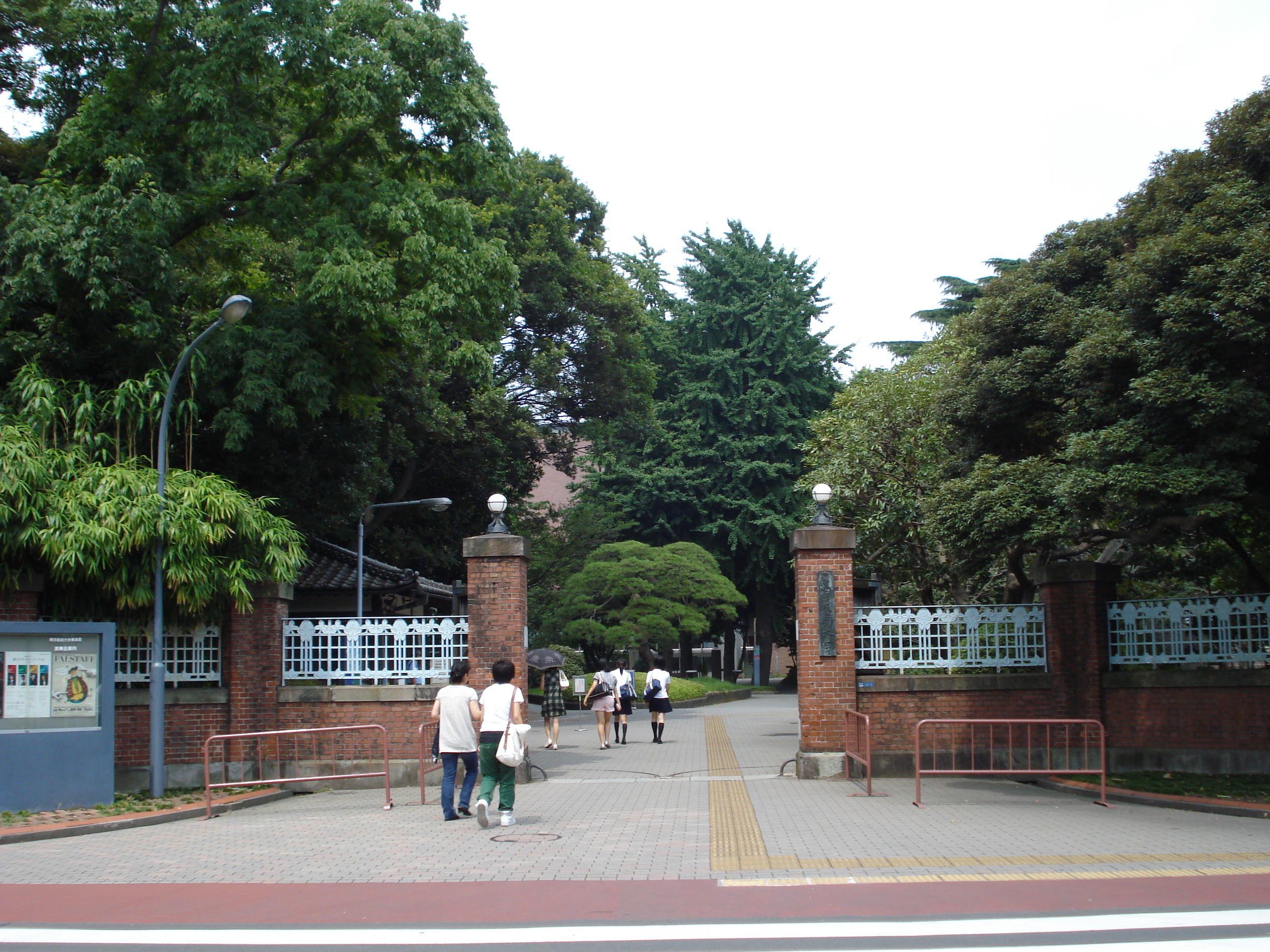
Entrance of the Department of Music

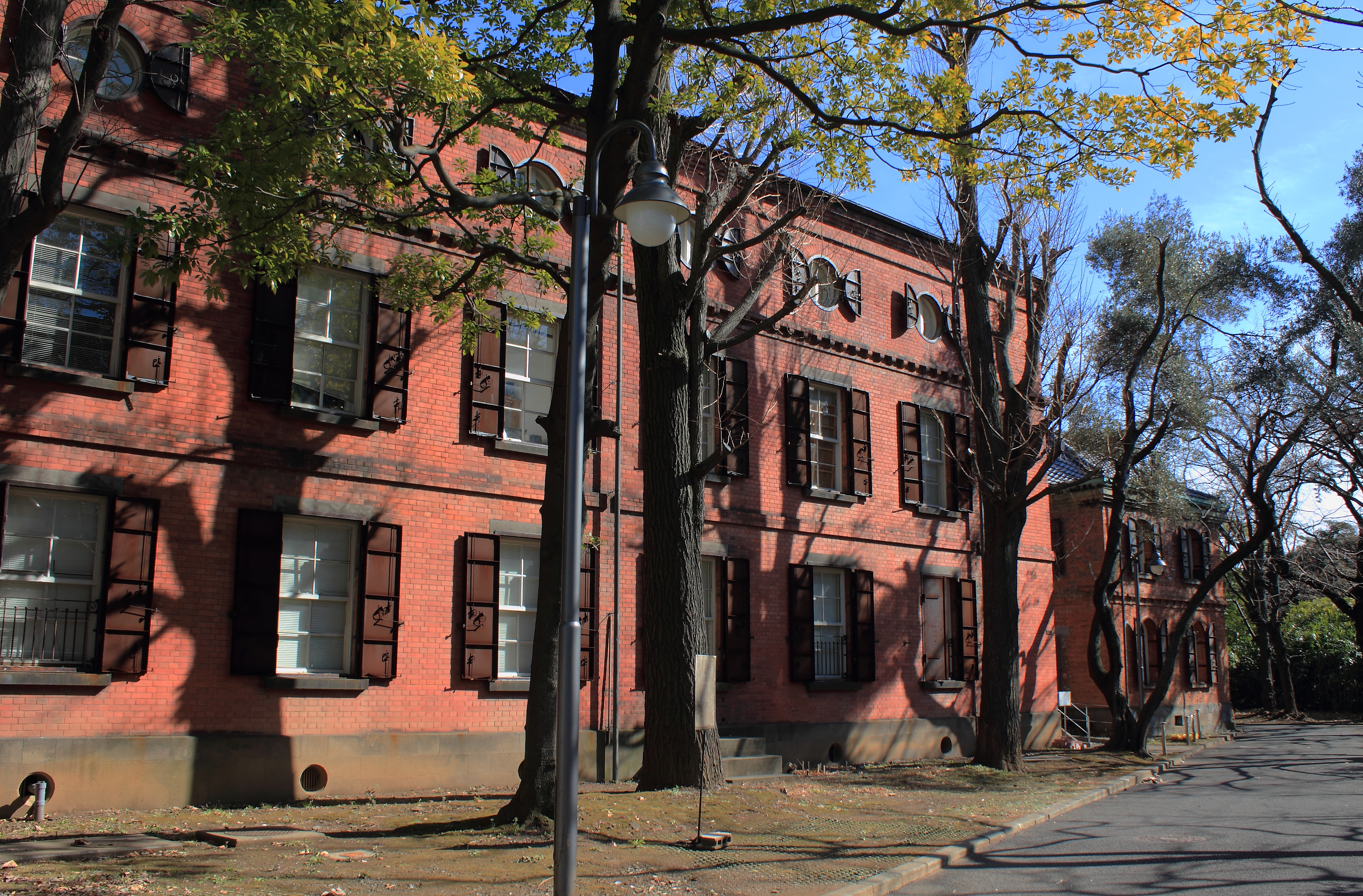
Building of the Department of Music

(Includes undergraduate and graduate school programs)

- Composition
- Conducting
- Vocal Music
- Piano
- Organ
- String instruments
- Wind and Percussion Instruments
- Early Music
- Musicology
- Traditional Japanese Music
- Musical Creativity and the Environment

=== Graduate School of Film and New Media ===
(Only for graduate students)

- Film production
- New media
- Animation
- Game and Interactive Arts

=== Graduate School of Global Arts ===
- Arts Studies and Curatorial Practices

== Organization ==
- University Art Museum
- University Library
- University Orchestra
- University Opera
- Administration Office
- Art Media Center
- Center for Music Research
- Geidai Art Plaza
- Health Care Service Center
- Institute of Ancient Art Research
- Oversea Student Center
- Photography Center
- Performing Arts Center
- Senior High School of Music
- Sogakudo Concert Hall
- Training Center for Foreign Language and Diction
- Center for Curatorial Studies

== Alumni ==
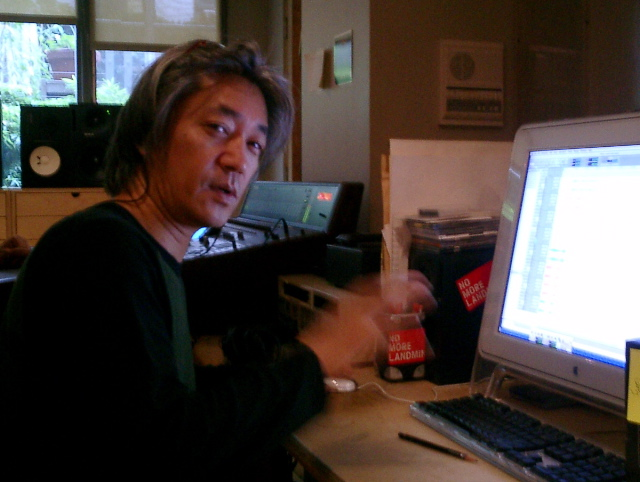
Composer Ryuichi Sakamoto (1952-2023)

Film director Teshigahara Hiroshi (1927-2001)

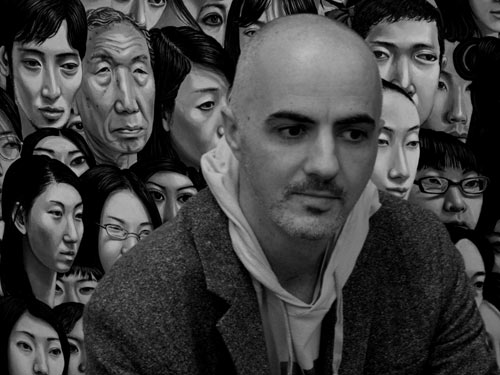
Painter Carl Randall (born 1975). Winner of the 2012 Nomura Art Prize at Tokyo Geidai.

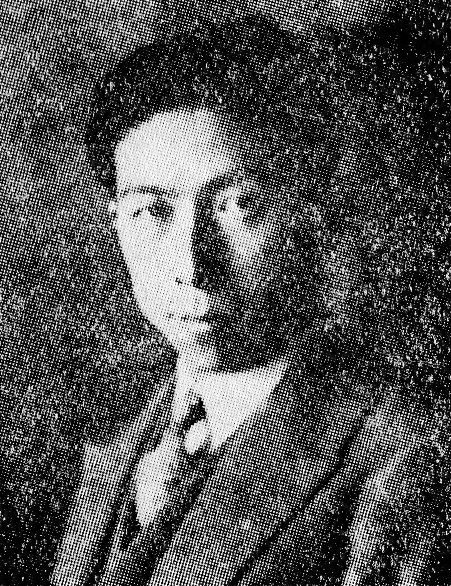
composer Kunihiko Hashimoto (1904–1949)

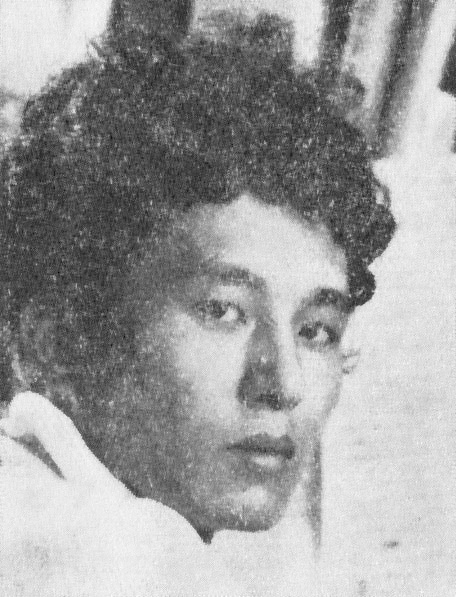
composer Toshiro Mayuzumi (1929–1997)

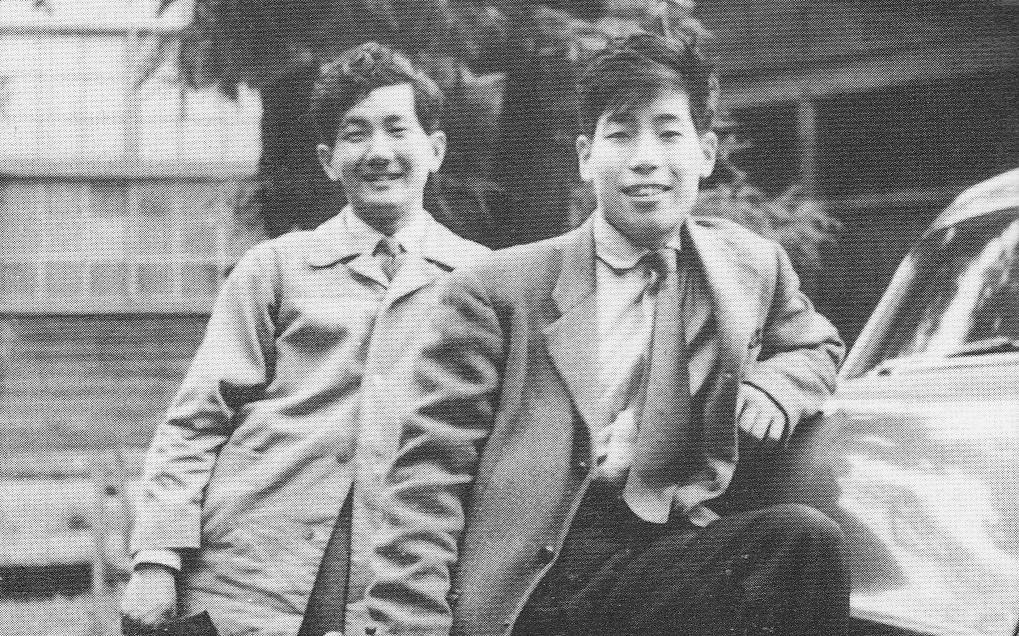
conductor Hiroyuki Iwaki(left) and Naozumi Yamamoto(right)

=== Artists ===
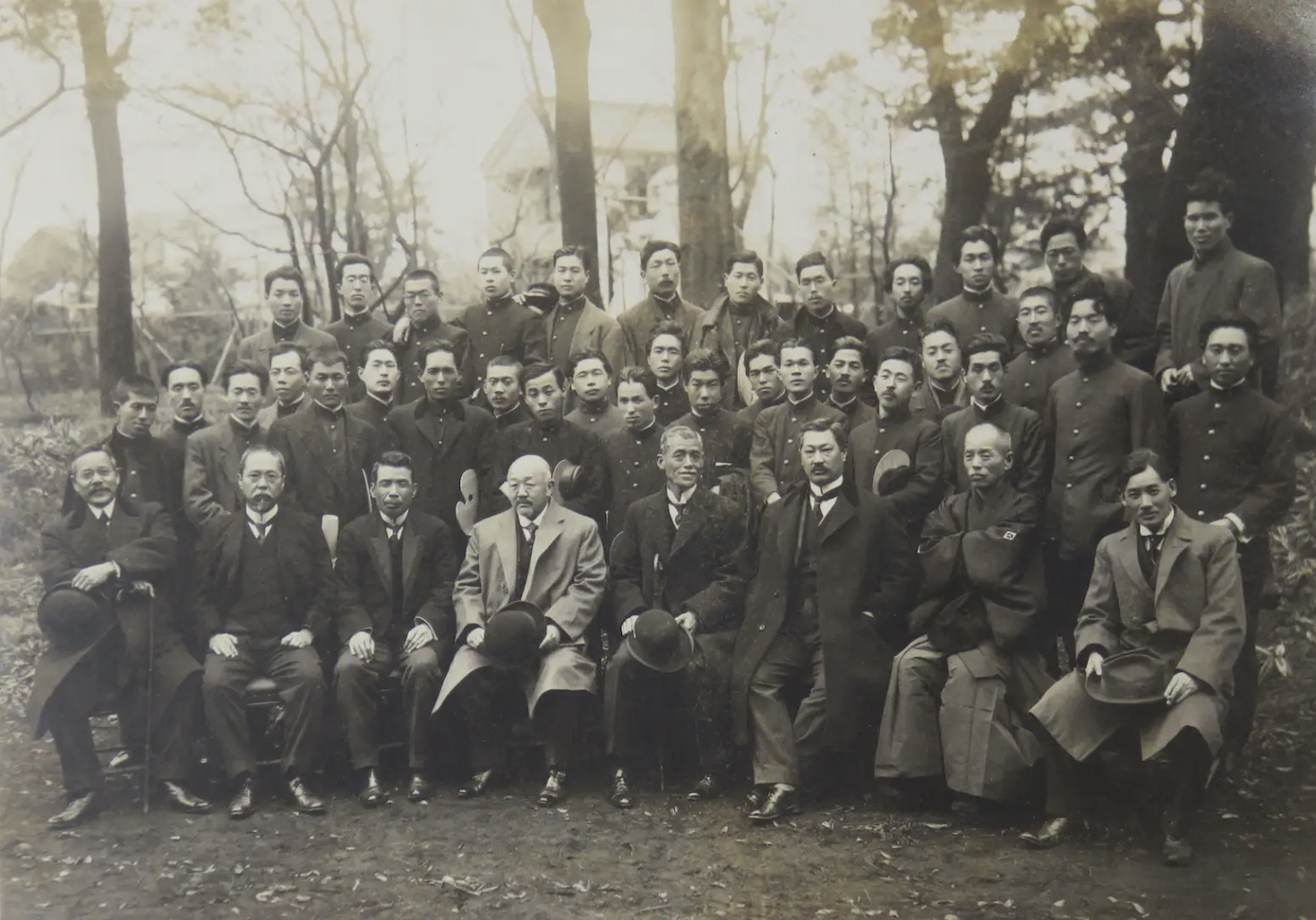
Artists at the Tokyo University of the Arts. In the middle is Kuroda Seiki

- Erina Matsui (painter)
- Aiko Miyanaga (sculptor)
- Firoz Mahmud (Bangladeshi contemporary Artist / painter)
- Eric Van Hove (Belgian artist)
- Takashi Murakami (artist)
- Yoshitoshi Abe (cartoonist / illustrator)
- Cóilín Ó Dubhghaill (metalworker and irogane researcher)
- Shin Egashira (Architect/ Sculptor)
- Tsuguharu Foujita (oil painter / sculptor)
- Shigeo Fukuda (graphic designer)
- Jin Goto (artist / painter - Nihonga painting)
- Fuyuko Matsui (painter)
- Kaii Higashiyama (painter)
- Ikuo Hirayama (painter)
- Shunsō Hishida (painter)
- Eiko Ishioka (designer)
- Mari Katayama (textile artist and photographer)
- Tōichi Katō (painter)
- Gyokudo Kawai (painter)
- Kim Su-keun (architect)
- Kim Yong-jun (art critic)
- Ryōhei Koiso (oil painter)
- Yōichi Kotabe (animator)
- Seiji Kurata (photographer)
- Tetsuya Noda (artist)
- Kakuzō Okakura (essayist)
- Tarō Okamoto (artist)
- Yukie Osumi (metalsmith)
- Carl Randall (painter)
- Lee Shih-chiao (painter)
- Kanzan Shimomura (painter)
- Yasushi Sugiyama (painter)
- Shinzaburo Takeda (printmaker / painter)
- Masao Tamiya (graphic artist)
- Tadao Tominari (photographer)
- Kōtarō Takamura (sculptor / poet)
- Hiroshi Teshigahara (film director)
- Eisaku Wada (painter / faculty)
- Tsubasa Yamaguchi (manga artist)
- Iwao Yamawaki (photographer / architect)
- Ryumon Yasuda (painter / sculptor)
- Taikan Yokoyama (painter)
- Yassan (GPS drawing)
- Yukihiko Yasuda (painter)
- Yorozu Tetsugoro (painter)
- Shotaro Sanada (painter)

=== Musicians ===
- Yasushi Akutagawa (composer)
- Ikuma Dan (composer)
- Ichiro Fujiyama (singer / composer)
- Akiko Futaba (singer)
- Mihoko Fujimura (operatic mezzo-soprano)
- Kunihiko Hashimoto (composer)
- Shiro Hamaguchi (composer / arranger)
- Masashi Hamauzu (composer)
- Hikaru Hayashi (composer)
- Ryohei Hirose (composer)
- Shin-ichiro Ikebe (composer)
- Hiroyuki Iwaki (conductor)
- Taku Iwasaki (composer)
- Hiroshi Kajiwara (pianist)
- Ken'ichiro Kobayashi (conductor)
- Jo Kondo (composer)
- Hayato Matsuo (composer)
- Toshiro Mayuzumi (composer)
- Minoru Miki (composer)
- Hajime Mizoguchi (composer)
- Makoto Moroi (composer)
- Kōtarō Nakagawa (composer / arranger)
- Akira Nishimura (composer)
- Shigeaki Saegusa (composer)
- Toshihiko Sahashi (composer)
- Ryuichi Sakamoto (composer)
- Kazue Sawai (koto player)
- Tadao Sawai (koto player and composer)
- Tatsuo Sasaki (Timpani/marimba player)
- Makoto Shinohara (composer)
- Masaaki Suzuki (organist / harpsichordist / conductor)
- Motoaki Takenouchi (composer)
- Yuzo Toyama (composer / conductor)
- Rentarō Taki (composer)
- Chiyuki Urano (baritone)
- Kosaku Yamada (composer / conductor)
- Kazuo Yamada (conductor)
- Akio Yashiro (composer)
- Akeo Watanabe (conductor)
- Diramore (composer / music director)

=== Others ===
- Kenji Ekuan (industrial designer)
- Eiji Aonuma (video game designer)
- Li Zuixiong (conservation scientist)
- Norio Ohga (former president of Sony / singer / conductor)
- Rin' (pop group)

== Faculty members ==
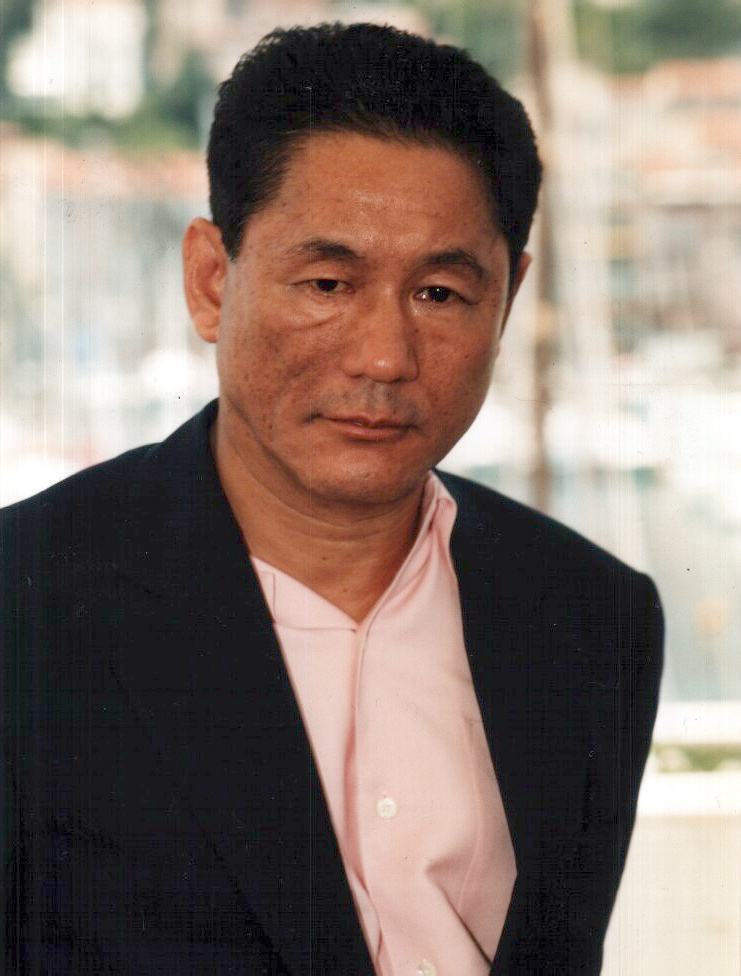
Film director Takeshi Kitano

- Masaki Fujihata (new media)
- Kazue Kobata (inter-media arts)
- Osamu Kido (sculpture)
- Atsushi Kitagawara (architecture)
- Takeshi Kitano (film)
- Ken-Ichiro Kobayashi (conducting)
- Kiyoshi Kurosawa (film)
- Toyomichi Kurita (film)
- Joun Ōshima (sculpture), noted Japanese sculptor in the Meiji/Taisho/Showa periods
- Meio Saitō (oil painting)
- Tokihiro Satō (inter-media arts)
- Michael W. Schneider (printmaking)
- Takashi Shimizu (violin)
- Kanzan Shimomura
- Masaaki Suzuki (early music)
- Ritsuko Taho (inter-media arts)
- Toru Takahashi (education)
- Kōun Takamura
- Kenji Watanabe (piano)
- Yoshiaki Watanabe (inter-media arts)
- Koji Yamamoto (industrial arts)

== See also ==
- List of National Treasures of Japan (ancient documents)
