= Pattern welding =

Swordmaking technique

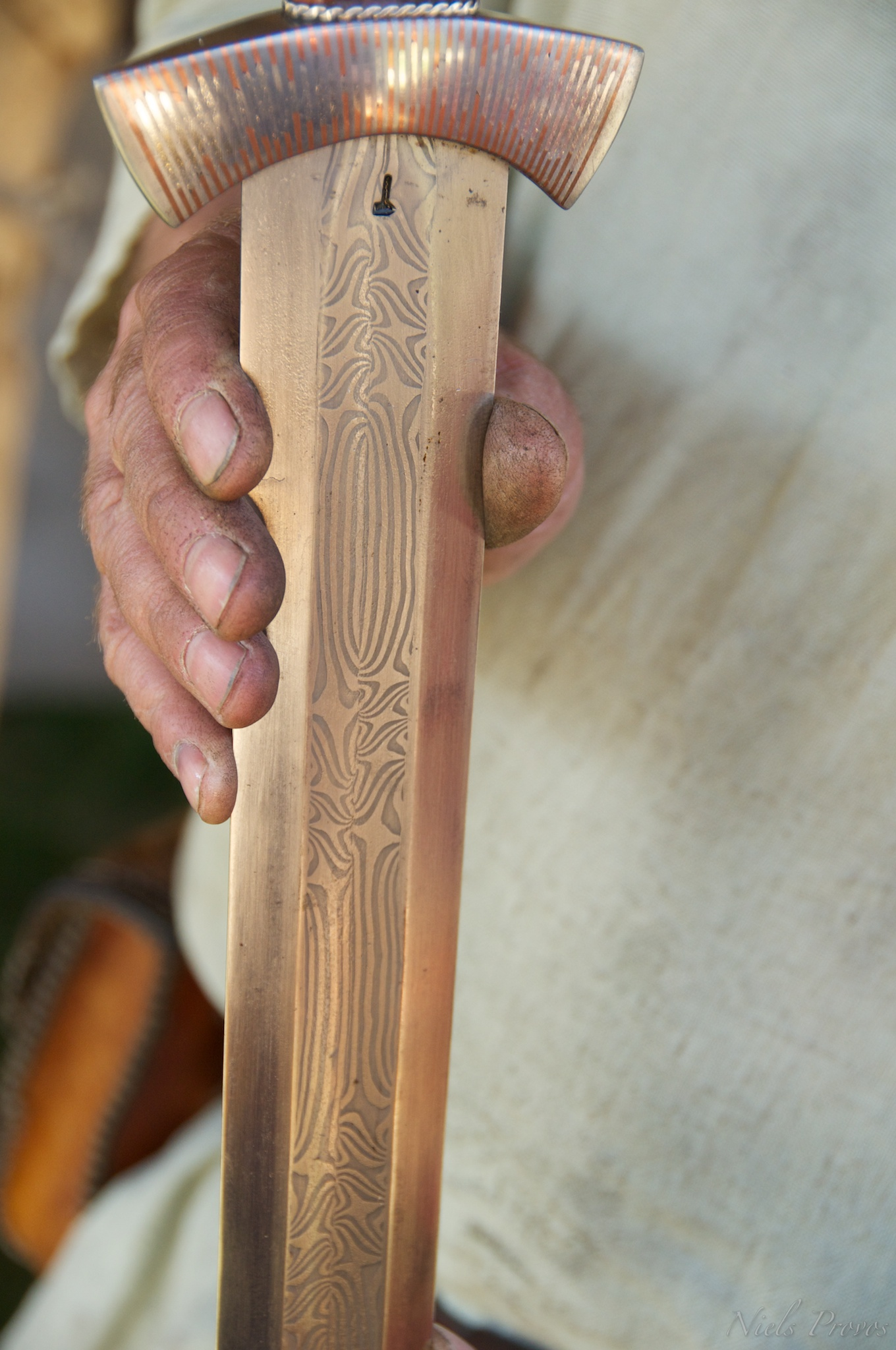
A contemporary pattern-welded sword blade made by Danish swordsmith Ejvind Nørgård. The blade shows a chevron pattern with opposing twists and straight laminate alternating.

Pattern welding is a smithing practice of folding and/or twisting metal, possibly multiple pieces (which may have differing compositions, or be completely different types of metal ...or be roughly the same, or all the same piece) that are forge-welded. This results in differing layers in a pattern, hence the name. This process was independently discovered by many ironworking societies. Often wrongly called Damascus steel, blades forged in this manner display bands of slightly different patterning along their entire length. These bands can be highlighted for cosmetic purposes by proper polishing or acid etching. Pattern welding was an outgrowth of laminated or piled steel, a similar technique used to combine steels of different carbon contents, providing a desired mix of hardness and toughness. Pattern welding also, more importantly, reduces impurities and, most importantly, homogenizes the steel. However, modern steelmaking processes negate the need to blend different steels, reduce impurities, or homogenize the steel. Pattern welding, using modern steel, is purely done for the cosmetic effects it produces. It is also used with non-steel metals, for its aesthetic properties, such as with mokume-gane.

== History ==
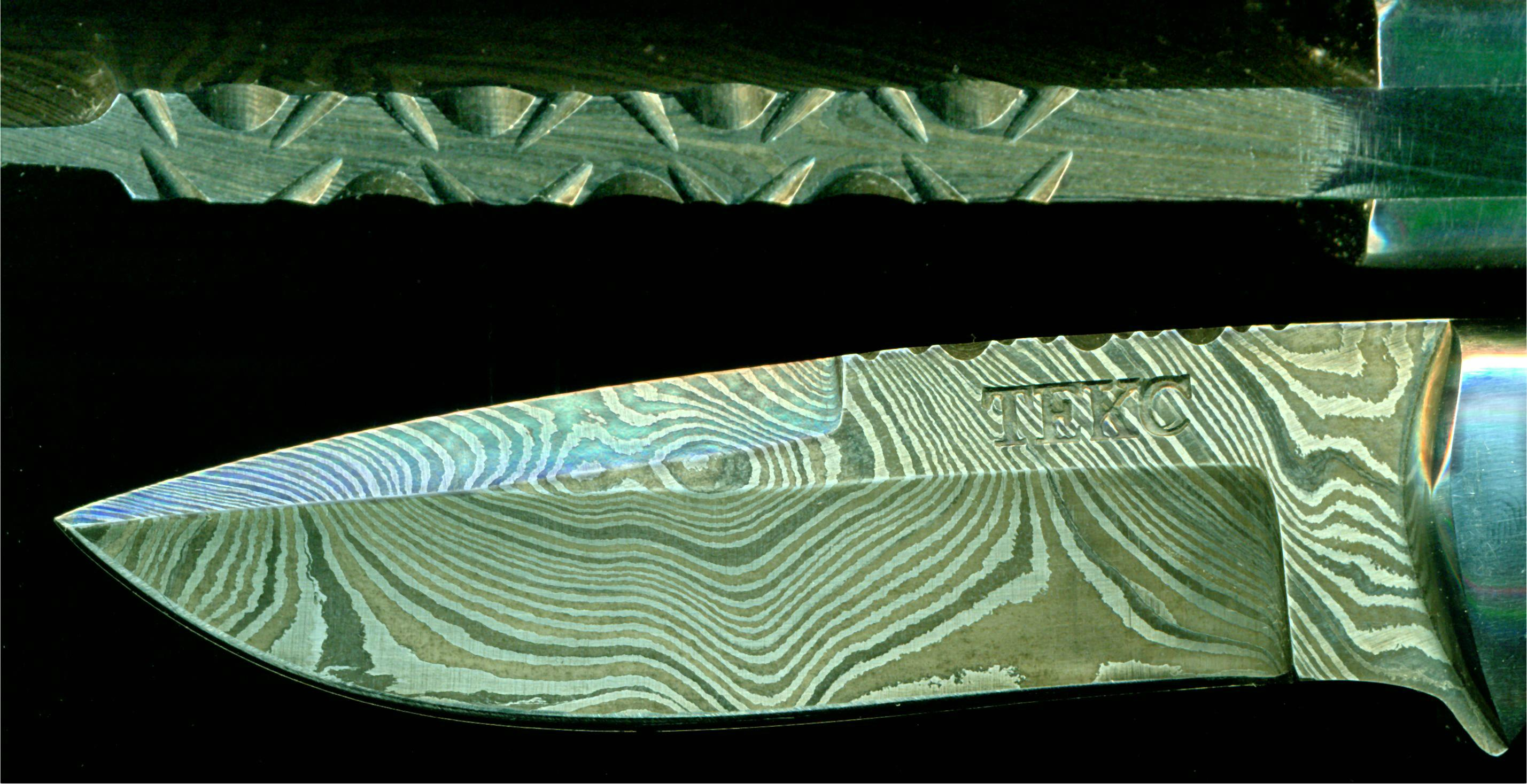
An image of a modern pattern welded knife blade, showing the dramatic patterning on the side below, and the layering of the steel in the spine above. Acid etching darkens the 1080 plain carbon steel more than it does the 15N20 low alloy nickel steel, producing alternating bands of light and dark on the surface.

Pattern welding developed out of the necessarily complex process of making blades that were both hard and tough from the erratic and unsuitable output from early iron smelting in bloomeries. The bloomery does not generate temperatures high enough to melt iron and steel, but instead reduces the iron oxide ore into particles of pure iron, which then weld into a mass of sponge iron, consisting of lumps of impurities in a matrix of relatively pure iron, which is too soft to make a good blade. Carburizing thin iron bars or plates forms a layer of harder, high-carbon steel on the surface, and early bladesmiths would forge these bars or plates together to form relatively homogeneous bars of steel. This laminating process, in which different types of steel together produce patterns that can be seen in the surface of the finished blade, forms the basis for pattern welding.

=== Pattern welding in Europe ===
Pattern welding dates to the first millennium BC, with Celtic, and later Germanic swords exhibiting the technique, with the Romans describing the blade patternation. By the 2nd and 3rd century AD, the Celts commonly used pattern welding for decoration in addition to structural reasons. The technique involves folding and forging alternating layers of steel into rods, then twisting the steel to form complex patterns when forged into a blade. By the 6th and 7th centuries, pattern welding had reached a level where thin layers of patterned steel were being overlaid onto a soft iron core, making the swords far better as the iron gave them a flexible and springy core that would take any shock from sword blows to stop the blade bending or snapping. By the end of the Viking Age, pattern welding fell out of use in Europe.

In medieval swords, pattern welding was more prevalent than commonly thought. However, the presence of rust makes detection difficult without repolishing.

During the Middle Ages, Wootz steel was produced in India and exported globally, including to Europe. The similarities in the markings led many to believe it was the same process being used, and pattern welding was revived by European smiths who were attempting to duplicate the Damascus steel. The methods used by Indian smiths to produce their Wootz steel was lost over the centuries.

The ancient swordmakers exploited the aesthetic qualities of pattern welded steel. The Vikings, in particular, were fond of twisting bars of steel around each other, welding the bars together by hammering and then repeating the process with the resulting bars, to create complex patterns in the final steel bar. Two bars twisted in opposite directions created the common chevron pattern. Often, the center of the blade was a core of soft steel, and the edges were solid high-carbon steel, similar to the laminates of the Japanese.

=== Modern decorative use ===
Pattern welding is still popular with contemporary bladesmiths both for visual effect and for recreating historic patterns and swords. Modern steels and methods allow for patterns with much higher number of visible layers compared to historical artifacts. Large numbers of layers can either be produced by folding similar to historical processes or by forge welding a small number of layers together, then cutting the billet in pieces to stack and forge-weld it again. This can be repeated until the desired number of layers have been achieved. A blade ground from such a blank can show a pattern similar to wood grain with small random variations in pattern. Some manufactured objects can be re-purposed into pattern welded blanks. "Cable Damascus", forged from high carbon multi-strand cable, is a popular item for bladesmiths to produce, producing a finely grained, twisted pattern, while chainsaw chains produce a pattern of randomly positioned blobs of color.

Some modern bladesmiths have combined traditional pattern welding techniques with new technology in innovative ways as a means of artistic expression. A layered billet of steel rods with the blade blank cut perpendicular to the layers can produce complex patterns, including mosaics or even writing. Powder metallurgy allows alloys that would not normally be compatible to be combined into solid bars. Different treatments of the steel after it is ground and polished, such as bluing, etching, or various other chemical surface treatments that react differently to the different metals used can create bright, high-contrast finishes on the steel. Some master smiths go as far as to use techniques such as electrical discharge machining to cut interlocking patterns out of different steels, fit them together, then weld the resulting assembly into a solid block of steel.

Blacksmiths will sometimes apply Wite-Out, Liquid Paper, or other types of correction fluid to metal that they do not want to weld together, as the titanium dioxide in the correction fluid forms a barrier between the metal it is applied-to and any other pieces of metal. For example, when creating pattern-welded steel by filling a steel canister with pieces of metal and powdered steel and forging it together into a single mass ("canister damascus steel,") smiths frequently coat the inside of the canister with correction fluid and let it dry before adding their materials. Thus, when the canister is heated and compressed using a hammer or pneumatic press, the material on the inside of the correction fluid is forged together, but it does not forge to the canister, allowing the pattern created by forging the different materials together to be seen in the finished piece because it is not covered by the homologous steel of the canister.

== Etymology ==
The term 'pattern welding' was coined by English archaeologist Herbert Maryon in a 1948 paper: "The welding of these swords represents an excessively difficult operation. I do not know of finer smith's work... I have named the technique ‘pattern welding’... Examples of pattern-welding range in date from the third century to the Viking Age."

== See also ==
- Bulat steel, a Russian crucible steel
- Damascus steel, a steel used in swordmaking during the medieval period
- Forged in Fire a History channel competitive television show on forged knife and sword making
- Hamon (swordsmithing)
- Japanese sword construction includes a specific form of pattern welding.
- Mokume-gane, a similar technique, often for precious metals, used to produce decorative pieces
- Wootz steel, an Indian crucible steel

== Sources ==
- Birch, Thomas (2013). "Does pattern-welding make Anglo-Saxon swords stronger?". In Dungworth, David & Doonan, Roger C. P. (eds.). Accidental and Experimental Archaeometallurgy. HMS Occasional Publications. Vol. 7. London: The Historical Metallurgy Society. pp. 127–134. ISBN 978-0-9560225-1-6.
- Durand-Charre, Madeleine (2014). Damascus and pattern-welded steels - Forging blades since the iron age: Forging blades since the iron age: Science des matériaux (Reprint ed.). Les Ulis, France: EDP Sciences. ISBN 978-2759816354.
- Engstrom, Robert; Lankton, Scott Michael & Lesher-Engstrom, Audrey (1989). A Modern Replication Based on the Pattern-Welded Sword of Sutton Hoo. Kalamazoo, Michigan: Medieval Institute Publications, Western Michigan University. ISBN 0-918720-29-X.
- Goddard, Wayne (2000). The Wonder of Knifemaking. Iola, Wisconsin: Krause Publications. pp. 107–120. ISBN 978-0-87341-798-3.
- Hrisoulas, Jim (May 1, 1994). The Pattern-Welded Blade: Artistry In Iron (Illustrated ed.). Paladin Press. ISBN 9781581605440.
- Lang, Janet. The Rise and Fall of Pattern Welding: An Investigation Into the Construction of Pre-medieval Sword Blades. University of Reading. School of Human and Environmental Sciences.
- Maryon, Herbert (1948). "A Sword of the Nydam Type from Ely Fields Farm, near Ely". Proceedings of the Cambridge Antiquarian Society. XLI. Cambridge Antiquarian Society: 73–76. doi:10.5284/1034398.
- Maryon, Herbert (February 1960). "Pattern-Welding and Damascening of Sword-Blades—Part 1: Pattern-Welding". Studies in Conservation. 5 (1). Taylor & Francis, Ltd. on behalf of the International Institute for Conservation of Historic and Artistic Works: 25–37. doi:10.2307/1505063. JSTOR 1505063.
- Maryon, Herbert (May 1960). "Pattern-Welding and Damascening of Sword-Blades—Part 2: The Damascene Process". Studies in Conservation. 5 (2). Taylor & Francis, Ltd. on behalf of the International Institute for Conservation of Historic and Artistic Works: 52–60. doi:10.2307/1504953. JSTOR 1504953.
- Meilach, Dona Z. (1977). Decorative and Sculptural Ironwork: Tools, Techniques, Inspiration (1st ed.). New York City: Crown Publishers, Inc. ISBN 0-517-52731-6.
- Meilach, Dona Z. (1999). Decorative and Sculptural Ironwork: Tools, Techniques & Inspiration (2nd ed.). Atglen, Pennsylvania: Schiffer Publishing. ISBN 0764307908.
- Peirce, Ian; Oakeshott, Ewart; Jones, Lee A. (May 24, 2007). "Blade Construction and Pattern-Welding". Swords of the Viking Age: catalogue of examples (New ed.). Woodbridge, UK, Rochester, NY: Boydell & Brewer, Limited. p. 145. ISBN 9781843830894.
- Peirce, Ian G. & Oakeshott, Ewart (2004). Swords of the Viking Age. Woodbridge: Boydell Press. ISBN 0-85115-914-1.
- Verhoeven, John D. (2002). "Genuine Damascus Steel: a type of banded microstructure in hypereutectoid steels" (PDF). Materials Technology. Steel Research, 73 (8). Iowa State University: 356–365. Archived from the original (PDF) on 3 September 2006 – via Internet Archive.
- Williams, Alan (May 3, 2012). The Sword and the Crucible: A History of the Metallurgy of European Swords Up to the 16th Century (Hardcover). History of Warfare (Book 77). Leiden: Brill Publishers. p. 75. ISBN 978-9004227835.
