= Irogane =

Set of Japanese metals

Irogane (色金 "coloured metals") is the term for a set of Japanese metals – forms of copper (with natural impurities), and copper alloys – treated in niiro patination processes, traditionally used in sword-making, catches for sliding doors, and luxury highlights on larger objects, and in modern times, in jewellery. The alloys contain two to five metals. Some scholars believe that methods similar to those involved in irogane production may also have been used in ancient Egypt and the Roman world, as well as China (wu tan) and Tibet (dzne-ksim).

== History ==
Raw copper with natural impurities, including yamagane, and highly refined copper (akagane, motogane) have been known from early times, and the alloys can be traced back between 300 and 900 years, or possibly as much as 1200. Shakudo, for example, may be referenced back to at least the 12th century. Shibuichi has a history of 550–750 years, with samples known from the 1630s. Due to the precious metal content, shakudo and shibuichi were always used sparingly, for small fittings on weapons, doors, small containers, or furniture.

The single most common historical usage was on the guard known as a tsuba that is fitted between the grip and the blade of the swords carried by samurai and the shōgun, and the banning of ceremonial sword-wearing under the Meiji Restoration had a material impact on production of irogane metals.

== Etymology ==
Irogane, or iro-gane, simply means "coloured metals". The same kanji character (金) is sometimes used for metal ("kane" or "gane"), gold ("kin") and silver ("gin"), and aside from the name irogane itself, these are elements of some of the irogane metal names. Others involve a combination of name elements from component metals and colours, for example, and one a reference to alloy composition proportions.

== List ==
The better known irogane metals include:

Shakudo or Shaku-do (literally "red copper")
an alloy of copper and gold, usually with 3-6% gold, but sometimes as low as 1% and as high as 10%, or higher. Tin is also sometimes also added, among other metals. In raw form, shakudo looks very like plain but slightly darkened copper, but depending on the patination process used, the final colour can be a lustrous purple to violet black, or a shade of purple (some shades are described as "like dark grapes"). Variations include shi-kin or kurasaki-kin, "purple gold", and u-kin, "cormorant gold," or "karasu-kin." In earlier times, there were perhaps fifteen different grades of shakudo. A pseudo-shakudo with no gold content was also produced at least once by the Japanese Imperial Mint.
Shibuichi or Shibu-ichi
an alloy of copper and silver, with the silver percentage usually between 15% and 40%, but varying as widely as 2% to 60%. The name means one quarter, a reference to one common formula. The raw alloy is of gun-metal grey or very pale bronze colour, while final colours include a wide range of greys, especially suitable for precious metal inlay work, but also browns, greens and even shades of blue-green. A variation with added gold is known as kuro shibuichi, and another is obore shirogane, "white metal with the colour of the veiled moon." There are also related compounds, such as sambogin and hojigin.
Kuromido or Kuromi-do
a mix of copper and arsenic, which some sources believe might have been equivalent to nigurome (ni-kuromi-do), mentioned in earlier accounts, and sometimes described as a substitute for shakudo, and sometimes used as a component in making further alloys instead of raw copper
Akagane or Suaka
refined copper, often with a naturally occurring small percentage of zinc or lead, which patination leaves somewhere between light orange and dark red
Yamagane, "mountain metal"
is raw copper, often containing some of one or more of tin, lead, silver and arsenic
Sentoku
an alloy of copper, zinc, tin and lead, final colour yellow to brown
Shinchu
a brass-like mix of copper, zinc and lead, usually 75–84% copper, and just 1–5% lead
Karakane
a bronze-like mix of copper, lead and tin, usually 77–93% copper, and 2–8% tin

According to William Gowland, a professor and senior member of the Japan Society in London (who was for a time Director of the Imperial Japanese Mint), aside from copper with natural impurities, the Japanese craftsmen would sometimes add a "pseudo-speiss" (a mix including some arsenic and / or antimony) to copper ore to make a base for production alloys.

== Finishing ==
The colouring and finishing of irogane surfaces generally involves polishing and cleaning, and chemical patination, and might include some final waxing or other treatment.

=== Patination ===
The chemical colouring of the surface is the key to irogane metals, and the details of the processes, and especially the compositions of the materials used to bathe the metals, are passed on within Japanese craft circles, and not widely documented, though some information was written down from the middle of the Edo period, and published more generally, in Japanese, in the early 20th century. Some simple recipes have been circulated, and some analysis of treated surfaces done in an attempt to understand the topic further, with considerable but still partial success. This process, an instance of soft-metal patination, known as niiro(-eko), or nikomi-chakushoku, and involving rokushō, has a history of at least 600 years but given references to at least one irogane metal, shakudo, go back 900 or more years, some similar process must have a like history.

Many of the patination processes involve boiling the metal in the modifying solution, and the final colour can depend on the duration of the boiling period, which may range from minutes to hours. Suaka, for example, may advance from a light brown after 2–4 hours, to orange-brown after 6 hours, to red towards 10 hours.

Notably, the traditional patination methods affect each metal differently, and have little or no effect on silver and gold elements, allowing for interesting effects when an object comprising multiple metals is patinated in one go to produce multiple final colours. Other effects are created by cutting through layers of patination to let underlying surfaces show through partly.

== See also ==
- Mokume-gane
- Niage Tutorial
- Corinthian bronze and hepatizon (Black bronze)
- Electrum
- Orichalcum
- Panchaloha
- Tumbaga
