= Shibuichi =

Historically Japanese copper alloy

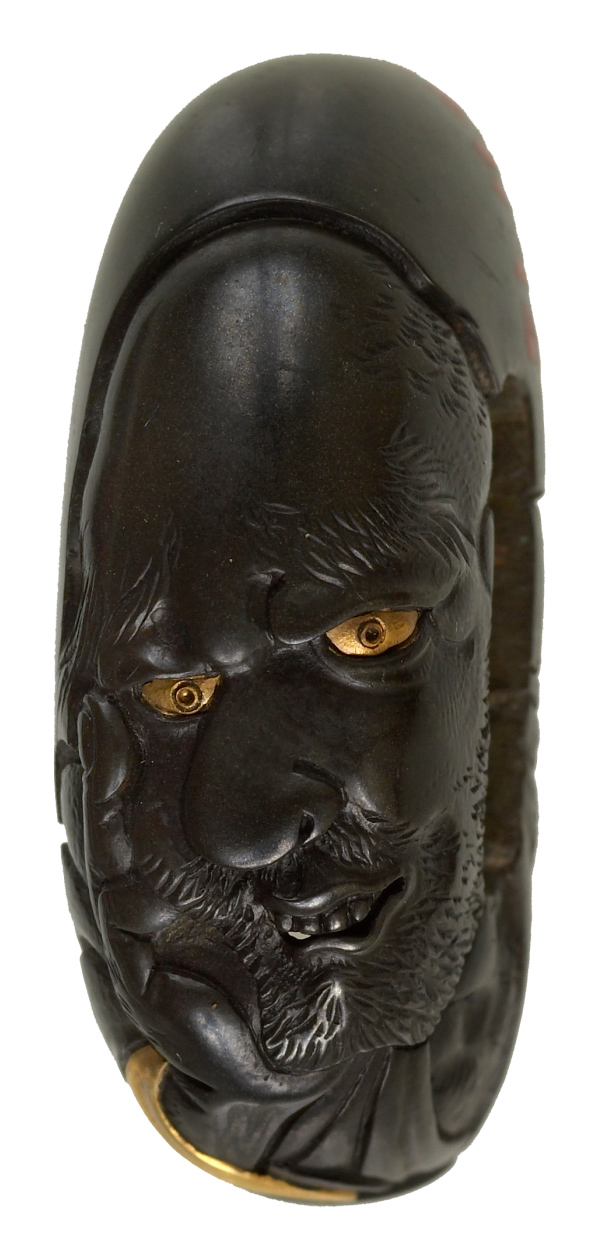
Kashira made of dark-finished shibuichi, with gold highlights

Shibuichi (四分一) is a historically Japanese copper alloy, a member of the irogane class, which is patinated into a range of subtle greys and muted shades of blue, green, and brown, through the use of niiro processes, involving the rokushō compound.

== Naming ==
Shibuichi means "four plus one" in Japanese, and indicates the standard formulation of one part silver to four parts copper, though this may vary considerably according to the desired effect. Several major variants of the alloy have specific names, as detailed below. In addition, the metal in general, and especially the paler shades, may be named rogin.

== Composition ==
Aside from the basic 20 silver to 80% copper mix, combinations as divergent as 5% silver to 95% copper are also marketed as "shibuichi". A wide range of colours can be achieved using the whole range of alloy compositions, even above 50% silver, e.g. 90% copper and 10% silver for a dark grey and down to 70% copper and 30% silver for lighter greys.

Variation of shibuichi
name (JA)	Ag : Cu, +Au	Note mentioned colors are after patination
Shibuichi	25 : 75	Dark grey, has a trace of gold
Shiro-shibuichi (kin-ichibusashi)	60 : 40, +1	Shiro = "white" in Japanese; lighter grey, harder, lower melting temperature
Ue-shibuichi (kin-ichibusashi)	40 : 60, +1	Ue = "upper" in Japanese; grey, harder
Nami-shibuichi uchi-sanbu (kin-ichibusashi)	30 : 70, +1	Nami = "regular" in Japanese; lighter than basic shibuichi
Nami-shibuichi soto-sanbu (kin-ichibusashi)	23 : 77, +1	Darker than basic shibuichi

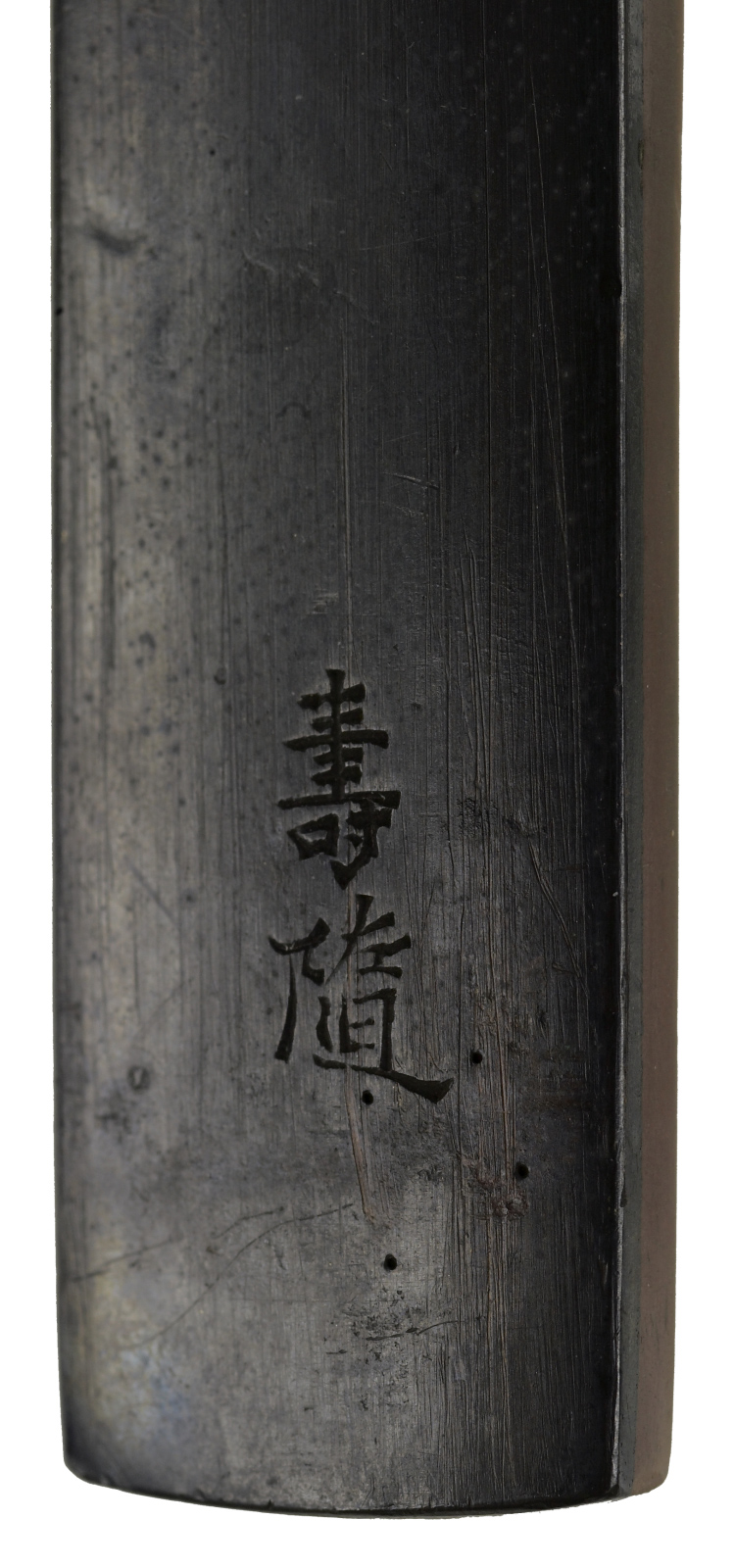
Reverse of a kozuka (showing the artist's signature) made out of intermediate gray-coloured shibuichi

=== Kuro-shibuichi (kin-ichibusashi) ===
Kuro is black in Japanese and kuro-shibuichi is different from other variants in the table, being a mixture of shibuichi (c. 40%) and shakudō (c. 60%) with around 1% of gold (proportions could be, for example, 9.9% silver, 87.3% copper, and 2.8% gold). Kuro-shibuichi will develop a black patina which is different from the black patina of shakudo.

It is a common misconception that both copper and silver oxides form, but in fact a detailed study has shown that only copper oxides are formed on the copper rich regions of the material's microstructure, while the silver rich regions are left largely untouched.

== History ==
The first official mention of the material is from the early 18th century, in documents from the State Mint, though it is believed to have existed before that. For most of its history, shibuichi was mostly used to ornament various fittings for Japanese swords until the Meiji reforms, when most swordmakers began to make purely decorative objects instead. The material is often used in mokume-gane combinations. Similar alloys have been used elsewhere but the use of shibuichi to achieve different colored patinas appears to have remained nearly unknown outside Japan, until recent interest from artisans in the West.

== See also ==
- Kuromido – Historically Japanese copper-arsenic alloy
- Mokume-gane – Japanese mixed-metal laminate
- Japanese sword – Type of traditionally made sword from Japan
- Corinthian bronze – Highly valuable metal alloy in classical antiquity
- Hepatizon – Alloy also known as Black Corinthian Bronze (Black bronze)
- Electrum – Alloy of gold and silver
- Tumbaga – Alloy of gold and copper used in pre-Columbian Mesoamerica
- Panchaloha – Term for traditional five-metal alloys used for Hindu artifacts
