= Shakudō =

Japanese copper and gold alloy

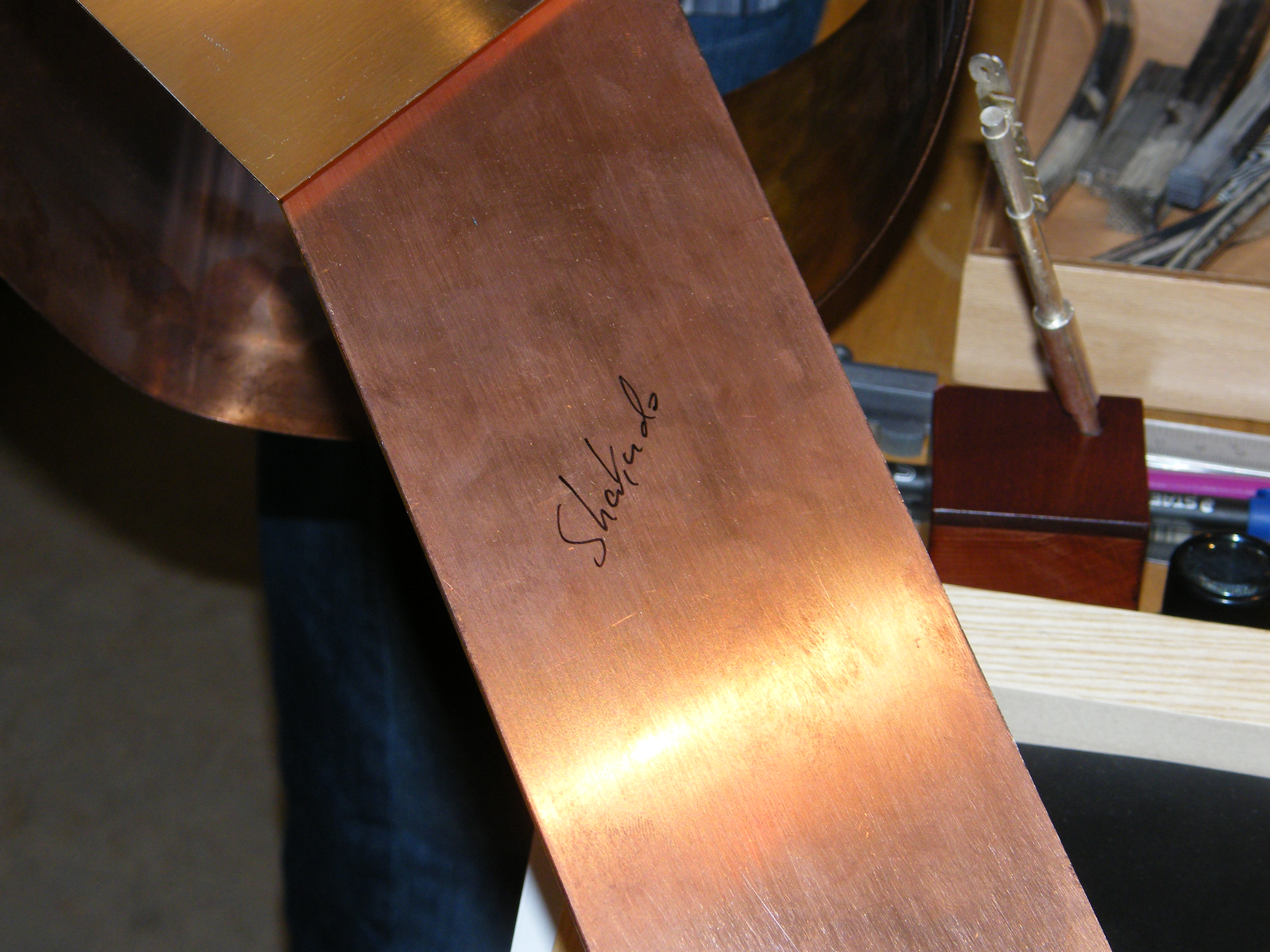
Unpatinated shakudō

Shakudō (赤銅) is a Japanese billon of gold and copper (typically 4–10% gold, 96–90% copper), one of the irogane class of colored metals, which can be treated to develop a black, or sometimes indigo, patina, resembling lacquer. Unpatinated shakudō visually resembles bronze; the dark color is induced by the niiro artificial patination process, involving boiling in a solution, generally including rokushō.

== Naming ==
The characters in the name shaku-dō mean "red" and "copper" but combined they represent this material which begins with a darkened coppery-bronze color and is then modified to black or near-black.

== History ==
=== Early uses ===
The word "shakudō" first appears in records of the Japanese Nara period (710-794 AD), but it is not clear to what it referred (it could have been some form of copper, or a form of the now-known material). There are actual pieces known from the 12th century onwards. Shakudō was historically used to construct or decorate Japanese sword ("nihonto") fittings such as tsuba, menuki, and kozuka, as well as other small ornaments, sliding door catches, and small boxes.

=== Introduction to the West ===
Shakudō was introduced to the West in the mid-19th century.

=== Possible origins ===
Materials like shakudo were historically thought to be specific to the Chinese and Japanese, and perhaps other Asian, milieu, but recent studies have noted close similarities to certain decorative alloys used in ancient Egypt, Greece, and Rome.

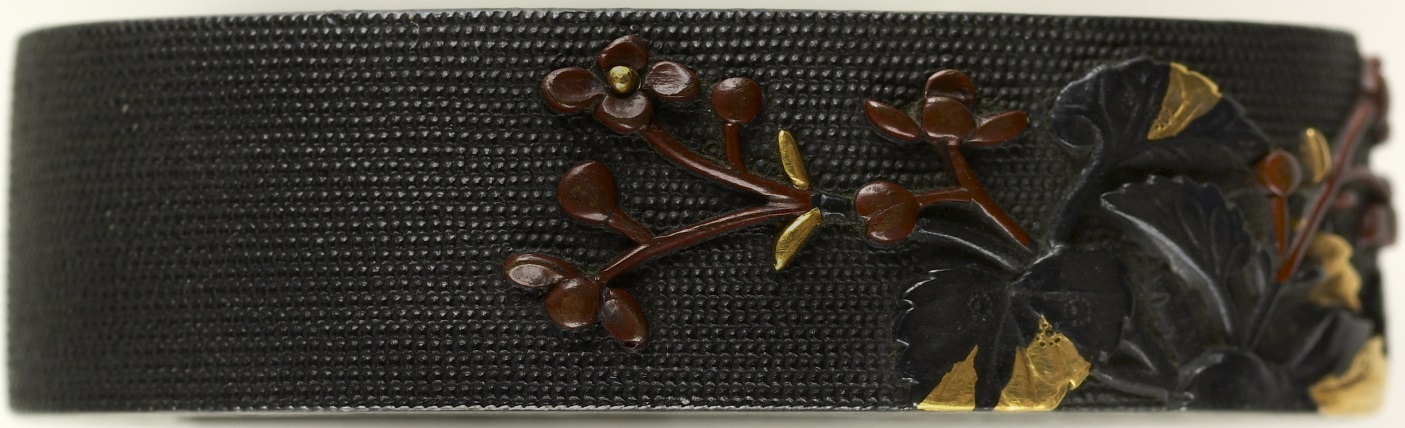
Fuchi. Shakudo, gold, copper alloy (sentoku). The Walters Art Museum.

== Production ==
The origins of shakudo date back to a period when Japan was still importing significant techniques and materials from Korea and China, but accounts of production all derive from much later, and little is known of their evolution. By the Meiji period, the initial production process entailed the heating of copper, addition of fine gold, and some addition of shirome, a by-product of copper production containing iron, arsenic and other elements. In the Edo period, it appears that the process may have used nigurome rather than copper; nigurome being itself a pre-made mix of copper and shirome. The resulting alloy was then allowed to rest in ingot moulds in heated water, before being shaped, and annealed at around 650 °C. In cooled form, the metal was then surface-finished using the niiro process. The modern process tends to omit the shirome, working with copper and gold, and other additives directly if needed.

== Use ==
Due to the expensive gold content, shakudō was normally limited to accents or small items such as tsuba. Larger historical objects (such as vases) that are described as shakudō may be mislabeled, especially if the glossy blue-black color is not evident. Unpatinated or repolished shakudō will not spontaneously patinate in air.

Modern artisans have revived the use of shakudō as a striking design element, in the making of jewelry, vessels, and for the technique of mokume-gane.

Shakudō is sometimes inaccurately used as a general term for damascened decorative metal inlays of Japanese origin. These were widely known in the West as Amita damascene, from the name of a 20th-century manufacturer of such items for export. Amita damascene included shakudo, shibuichi, gold, silver, and bronze for inlays.

== See also ==
- Shibuichi – Historically Japanese copper alloy
- Kuromido – Historically Japanese copper-arsenic alloy
- Mokume-gane – Japanese mixed-metal laminate
- Japanese sword – Type of traditionally made sword from Japan
- Corinthian bronze – Highly valuable metal alloy in classical antiquity
- Hepatizon – Alloy also known as Black Corinthian Bronze
- Electrum – Alloy of gold and silver
- Tumbaga – Alloy of gold and copper used in pre-Columbian Mesoamerica
- Panchaloha – Term for traditional five-metal alloys used for Hindu artifacts
