= Kuromido =

Historically Japanese copper-arsenic alloy

Kuromido (Japanese: 黒味銅) is an historically Japanese copper alloy, typically of 99% copper and 1% metallic arsenic, one of the class of irogane metals.

It is used in the production of other alloys, and in decorative fittings, as well as in mokume-gane processes.

== See also ==
- Shakudō
- Shibuichi
- Corinthian bronze and hepatizon (Black bronze)
- Electrum
- Orichalcum
- Panchaloha
- Tumbaga

== External sources ==
- Untracht, Oppi (d. 2008) (2011) [1982]. Jewelry Concepts & Technology. Knopf Doubleday Publishing. ISBN 978-0-307-78411-7.
