= Mokume-gane =

Japanese mixed-metal laminate

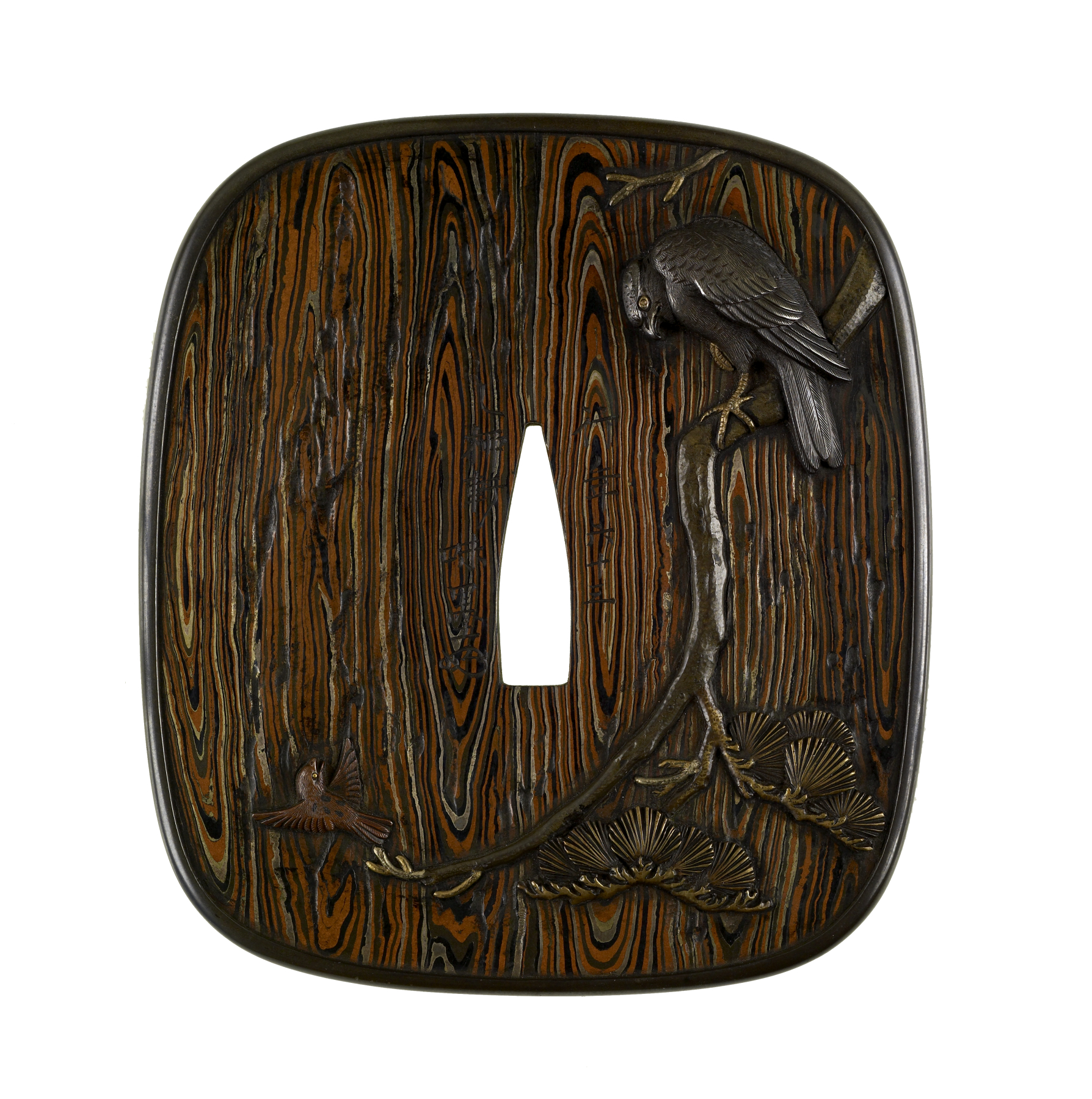
Tsuba with a hawk and a sparrow, made by Hamano Masanobu, using the mokume-gane technique

Mokume-gane (木目金) is a Japanese metalworking procedure which produces a mixed-metal laminate with distinctive layered patterns; the term is also used to refer to the resulting laminate itself. The term mokume-gane translates closely to 'wood grain metal' or 'wood eye metal' and describes the way metal takes on the appearance of natural wood grain. Mokume-gane fuses several layers of differently coloured precious metals together to form a sandwich of alloys called a "billet." The billet is then manipulated in such a way that a pattern resembling wood grain emerges over its surface. Numerous ways of working mokume-gane create diverse patterns. Once the metal has been rolled into a sheet or bar, several techniques are used to produce a range of effects.

Mokume-gane has been used to create many artistic objects. Though the technique was first developed for production of decorative sword fittings, the craft is today mostly used in the production of jewelry and hollowware.

== History ==
=== Origins ===
First developed in 17th-century Japan, mokume-gane was originally used for swords. As the customary Japanese sword stopped serving as a weapon and became largely a status symbol, a demand arose for elaborate decorative handles and sheaths.

To meet this demand, Denbei Shoami (1651–1728), a master metalworker from Akita prefecture, invented the mokume-gane process. He initially called his product guri bori, as the technique in its simplest form resembled guri, a type of carved lacquerwork with alternating layers of red and black. Other historical names for it were kasumi-uchi (cloud metal), itame-gane (wood-grain metal), and yosefuki.

The early components of mokume-gane were relatively soft metals and alloys (gold, copper, silver, shakudō, shibuichi, and kuromido) which would form liquid phase diffusion bonds with one another without completely melting. This was useful in the traditional techniques of fusing and soldering the layers together.

Over time, the practice of mokume-gane faded. The katana industry dried up in the late 19th century, with the Meiji Restoration returning ruling power to the emperor, following the dissolution of the shogunate government and the end of the samurai class. The public display of swords as a sign of samurai status was outlawed. After this, the few metalsmiths who practiced mokume-gane along with most other sword related artisans largely transferred their skills to create other objects.

=== Adoption of mokume-gane in the West ===
Tiffany & Co's silver division under the direction of Edward C. Moore began to experiment with mokume-gane techniques around 1877, and at the Paris exposition of 1878, Tiffany's grand prize-winning display of Moore's "Japanesque" silver wares included a magnificent "Conglomerate Vase" with asymmetrical panels of mokume-gane. Moore and Tiffany's silver smiths continued to develop its popular mokume-gane techniques in preparation for the Paris exposition of 1889, where it displayed a vast array of Japanesque silver, using ever more complex alloys of shakudō, sedo and shibuichi, along with gold and silver, to make laminates of up to twenty-four layers. Tiffany's display again won the grand prize for silver wares, and the company continued to produce its Japanesque silver with mokume-gane techniques up into the 20th century.

=== 20th-21st century development ===
By the mid 20th century, mokume-gane had fallen into heavy obscurity. Japan's movement away from traditional craftwork, paired with the great difficulty of mastering mokume-gane, had brought mokume-gane artisans to the brink of extinction. It reached a point where only scholars and collectors of metalwork were aware of the technique. It was not until the 1970s, when Hiroko Sato Pijanowski – who learned the craft from Norio Tamagawa – that the craft was reignited in the public eye, as Hiroko and her husband Eugene Pijanowski brought the craft of mokume-gane back to the United States and began teaching it to their students.

=== Present day ===
Today, jewelry, flatware, hollowware, spinning tops and other artistic objects are made using mokume-gane.

Modern processes are highly controlled and include a compressive force on the billet. This has allowed the technique to include many nontraditional components such as titanium, platinum, iron, bronze, brass, nickel silver, and various colors of karat gold including yellow, white, sage, and rose hues as well as sterling silver. At the Santa Fe Symposium, a major annual gathering of jewelers from around the world, there have been several papers presented on new, more predictable, and more economic, methods of producing mokume-gane materials, along with new possibilities for laminating metals such as the use of friction-stir welding.

== Techniques ==
Mokume-gane brass/copper billet

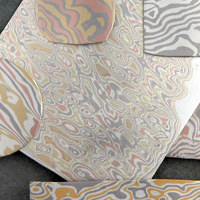
Example of Mokume-gane patterns in gold and silver alloys

=== Liquid phase fusion (historic) ===
In liquid phase fusion, metal sheets were stacked and carefully heated; the solid billet of simple stripes could be forged and carved to increase the pattern's complexity. Successful lamination using this process requires a highly skilled smith with a great deal of experience. Bonding in the traditional process is achieved when some or all of the alloys in the stack are heated to the point of becoming partially molten (above solidus) this liquid alloy is what fuses the layers together. Careful heat control and skillful forging are required for this process.

=== Soldering (brazing) ===
In attempting to recreate the appearance of traditional mokume-gane, some artisans tried brazing layers together. The sheets were soldered using silver solder or some other brazing alloy. This technique joined the metals, but is difficult to perfect, particularly on larger sheets, because flux inclusions can get trapped or bubbles could form. Commonly, these imperfections need to be cut out, and the metal re-soldered. In addition, brazed sheets also do not display the same levels of ductility and work-ability of diffusion-bonded material.

=== Solid-state bonding (contemporary) ===
The modernized process of solid-state bonding typically uses a controlled atmosphere in a temperature-controlled furnace. Mechanical aids such as a hydraulic press or torque plates (bolted clamps) are also typically used to apply compressive force on the billet during lamination. These provide for the implementation of lower temperature solid-state diffusion between the interleaved layers, thus allowing the inclusion of non-traditional materials.

== Development of the mokume-gane pattern ==
After the layer fusion, the surface of the billet is cut with chisel to expose lower layers, then flattened. This cutting and flattening process will be repeated over and over again to develop intricate patterns.

== Coloring ==
To increase the contrast between the laminate layers, many mokume-gane items are colored by the application of a patina (a controlled corrosion layer) to accentuate or even totally change the colors of the metal's surface.

=== Niiro patination and rokushō ===
One example of a traditional Japanese patination for mokume-gane is the use of the niiro process, usually involving rokushō, a complex copper verdigris compound produced specifically for use as a patina. The piece to be patinated is prepared, then immersed in a boiling solution until it reaches the desired color, and each element of a compound piece may be transformed to a different color. Historically, a paste of ground daikon radish was also used to prepare the work for the patina. The paste was applied immediately before the piece is boiled in the rokushō to protect the surface against tarnish and uneven coloring.

== Similar laminates ==
In an accidental but parallel development, Sheffield plate was developed in England. It follows a similar principal of bonded layers, without use of solder, but typically had 2–3 layers, whereas mokume-gane could have many more.

== See also ==
- Mokume-gane titanium rings – Jewelry rings or bands mainly of titanium
- Pattern welding – Swordmaking technique
- Damascus steel – Type of steel used in Middle Eastern swordmaking
